

288001–288100 

|-bgcolor=#fefefe
| 288001 ||  || — || October 23, 2003 || Anderson Mesa || LONEOS || V || align=right data-sort-value="0.99" | 990 m || 
|-id=002 bgcolor=#fefefe
| 288002 ||  || — || October 23, 2003 || Anderson Mesa || LONEOS || — || align=right | 1.1 km || 
|-id=003 bgcolor=#fefefe
| 288003 ||  || — || October 20, 2003 || Kitt Peak || Spacewatch || FLO || align=right data-sort-value="0.73" | 730 m || 
|-id=004 bgcolor=#E9E9E9
| 288004 ||  || — || October 21, 2003 || Kitt Peak || Spacewatch || — || align=right | 1.7 km || 
|-id=005 bgcolor=#E9E9E9
| 288005 ||  || — || October 21, 2003 || Anderson Mesa || LONEOS || — || align=right | 1.3 km || 
|-id=006 bgcolor=#fefefe
| 288006 ||  || — || October 21, 2003 || Socorro || LINEAR || FLO || align=right data-sort-value="0.79" | 790 m || 
|-id=007 bgcolor=#fefefe
| 288007 ||  || — || October 21, 2003 || Socorro || LINEAR || — || align=right | 1.5 km || 
|-id=008 bgcolor=#E9E9E9
| 288008 ||  || — || October 21, 2003 || Kitt Peak || Spacewatch || — || align=right | 1.4 km || 
|-id=009 bgcolor=#E9E9E9
| 288009 ||  || — || October 21, 2003 || Kitt Peak || Spacewatch || — || align=right | 2.7 km || 
|-id=010 bgcolor=#E9E9E9
| 288010 ||  || — || October 22, 2003 || Kitt Peak || Spacewatch || — || align=right data-sort-value="0.87" | 870 m || 
|-id=011 bgcolor=#d6d6d6
| 288011 ||  || — || October 22, 2003 || Kitt Peak || Spacewatch || HYG || align=right | 3.3 km || 
|-id=012 bgcolor=#fefefe
| 288012 ||  || — || October 22, 2003 || Kitt Peak || Spacewatch || — || align=right data-sort-value="0.84" | 840 m || 
|-id=013 bgcolor=#fefefe
| 288013 ||  || — || October 23, 2003 || Anderson Mesa || LONEOS || NYS || align=right data-sort-value="0.86" | 860 m || 
|-id=014 bgcolor=#E9E9E9
| 288014 ||  || — || October 23, 2003 || Kitt Peak || Spacewatch || — || align=right | 1.6 km || 
|-id=015 bgcolor=#E9E9E9
| 288015 ||  || — || October 23, 2003 || Kitt Peak || Spacewatch || ADE || align=right | 2.8 km || 
|-id=016 bgcolor=#fefefe
| 288016 ||  || — || October 24, 2003 || Socorro || LINEAR || — || align=right | 1.1 km || 
|-id=017 bgcolor=#fefefe
| 288017 ||  || — || October 24, 2003 || Socorro || LINEAR || NYS || align=right data-sort-value="0.77" | 770 m || 
|-id=018 bgcolor=#fefefe
| 288018 ||  || — || October 21, 2003 || Palomar || NEAT || — || align=right data-sort-value="0.69" | 690 m || 
|-id=019 bgcolor=#d6d6d6
| 288019 ||  || — || October 22, 2003 || Kitt Peak || Spacewatch || HYG || align=right | 3.4 km || 
|-id=020 bgcolor=#E9E9E9
| 288020 ||  || — || October 22, 2003 || Kitt Peak || Spacewatch || NEM || align=right | 3.0 km || 
|-id=021 bgcolor=#E9E9E9
| 288021 ||  || — || October 22, 2003 || Socorro || LINEAR || IAN || align=right | 1.4 km || 
|-id=022 bgcolor=#E9E9E9
| 288022 ||  || — || October 23, 2003 || Kitt Peak || Spacewatch || — || align=right | 1.8 km || 
|-id=023 bgcolor=#fefefe
| 288023 ||  || — || October 23, 2003 || Kitt Peak || Spacewatch || — || align=right | 1.4 km || 
|-id=024 bgcolor=#fefefe
| 288024 ||  || — || October 23, 2003 || Anderson Mesa || LONEOS || — || align=right data-sort-value="0.85" | 850 m || 
|-id=025 bgcolor=#fefefe
| 288025 ||  || — || October 23, 2003 || Anderson Mesa || LONEOS || NYS || align=right data-sort-value="0.88" | 880 m || 
|-id=026 bgcolor=#fefefe
| 288026 ||  || — || October 23, 2003 || Kitt Peak || Spacewatch || V || align=right data-sort-value="0.83" | 830 m || 
|-id=027 bgcolor=#d6d6d6
| 288027 ||  || — || October 24, 2003 || Socorro || LINEAR || — || align=right | 3.3 km || 
|-id=028 bgcolor=#E9E9E9
| 288028 ||  || — || October 24, 2003 || Kitt Peak || Spacewatch || — || align=right | 1.9 km || 
|-id=029 bgcolor=#E9E9E9
| 288029 ||  || — || October 22, 2003 || Kitt Peak || Spacewatch || ADE || align=right | 3.1 km || 
|-id=030 bgcolor=#d6d6d6
| 288030 ||  || — || October 24, 2003 || Socorro || LINEAR || VER || align=right | 4.7 km || 
|-id=031 bgcolor=#fefefe
| 288031 ||  || — || October 24, 2003 || Socorro || LINEAR || — || align=right data-sort-value="0.79" | 790 m || 
|-id=032 bgcolor=#E9E9E9
| 288032 ||  || — || October 24, 2003 || Kitt Peak || Spacewatch || — || align=right | 2.2 km || 
|-id=033 bgcolor=#E9E9E9
| 288033 ||  || — || October 24, 2003 || Socorro || LINEAR || — || align=right | 2.1 km || 
|-id=034 bgcolor=#E9E9E9
| 288034 ||  || — || October 24, 2003 || Socorro || LINEAR || — || align=right | 1.1 km || 
|-id=035 bgcolor=#fefefe
| 288035 ||  || — || October 25, 2003 || Kitt Peak || Spacewatch || — || align=right | 1.1 km || 
|-id=036 bgcolor=#fefefe
| 288036 ||  || — || October 25, 2003 || Socorro || LINEAR || FLO || align=right data-sort-value="0.74" | 740 m || 
|-id=037 bgcolor=#E9E9E9
| 288037 ||  || — || October 25, 2003 || Socorro || LINEAR || — || align=right | 2.6 km || 
|-id=038 bgcolor=#d6d6d6
| 288038 ||  || — || October 25, 2003 || Socorro || LINEAR || EUP || align=right | 6.3 km || 
|-id=039 bgcolor=#fefefe
| 288039 ||  || — || October 26, 2003 || Kitt Peak || Spacewatch || NYS || align=right data-sort-value="0.73" | 730 m || 
|-id=040 bgcolor=#E9E9E9
| 288040 ||  || — || October 27, 2003 || Kitt Peak || Spacewatch || — || align=right | 3.6 km || 
|-id=041 bgcolor=#fefefe
| 288041 ||  || — || October 27, 2003 || Anderson Mesa || LONEOS || V || align=right data-sort-value="0.85" | 850 m || 
|-id=042 bgcolor=#E9E9E9
| 288042 ||  || — || October 28, 2003 || Socorro || LINEAR || JUN || align=right | 1.5 km || 
|-id=043 bgcolor=#E9E9E9
| 288043 ||  || — || October 24, 2003 || Bergisch Gladbach || W. Bickel || PAD || align=right | 2.2 km || 
|-id=044 bgcolor=#E9E9E9
| 288044 ||  || — || October 17, 2003 || Palomar || NEAT || — || align=right | 2.0 km || 
|-id=045 bgcolor=#d6d6d6
| 288045 ||  || — || October 17, 2003 || Palomar || NEAT || — || align=right | 5.8 km || 
|-id=046 bgcolor=#E9E9E9
| 288046 ||  || — || October 28, 2003 || Socorro || LINEAR || — || align=right | 3.2 km || 
|-id=047 bgcolor=#d6d6d6
| 288047 ||  || — || October 30, 2003 || Socorro || LINEAR || — || align=right | 3.1 km || 
|-id=048 bgcolor=#E9E9E9
| 288048 ||  || — || October 27, 2003 || Kitt Peak || Spacewatch || — || align=right | 1.8 km || 
|-id=049 bgcolor=#d6d6d6
| 288049 ||  || — || October 29, 2003 || Anderson Mesa || LONEOS || — || align=right | 3.7 km || 
|-id=050 bgcolor=#d6d6d6
| 288050 ||  || — || October 21, 2003 || Palomar || NEAT || — || align=right | 3.9 km || 
|-id=051 bgcolor=#fefefe
| 288051 ||  || — || October 23, 2003 || Kitt Peak || Spacewatch || — || align=right | 1.1 km || 
|-id=052 bgcolor=#E9E9E9
| 288052 ||  || — || October 18, 2003 || Socorro || LINEAR || — || align=right | 2.9 km || 
|-id=053 bgcolor=#E9E9E9
| 288053 ||  || — || October 16, 2003 || Kitt Peak || Spacewatch || JUN || align=right data-sort-value="0.93" | 930 m || 
|-id=054 bgcolor=#E9E9E9
| 288054 ||  || — || October 16, 2003 || Palomar || NEAT || HNS || align=right | 1.8 km || 
|-id=055 bgcolor=#fefefe
| 288055 ||  || — || October 17, 2003 || Kitt Peak || Spacewatch || — || align=right | 1.00 km || 
|-id=056 bgcolor=#E9E9E9
| 288056 ||  || — || October 17, 2003 || Kitt Peak || Spacewatch || — || align=right | 3.0 km || 
|-id=057 bgcolor=#E9E9E9
| 288057 ||  || — || October 19, 2003 || Kitt Peak || Spacewatch || AER || align=right | 1.8 km || 
|-id=058 bgcolor=#E9E9E9
| 288058 ||  || — || October 19, 2003 || Kitt Peak || Spacewatch || KON || align=right | 2.7 km || 
|-id=059 bgcolor=#E9E9E9
| 288059 ||  || — || October 29, 2003 || Anderson Mesa || LONEOS || — || align=right | 1.2 km || 
|-id=060 bgcolor=#E9E9E9
| 288060 ||  || — || October 20, 2003 || Socorro || LINEAR || — || align=right | 3.2 km || 
|-id=061 bgcolor=#fefefe
| 288061 ||  || — || October 21, 2003 || Anderson Mesa || LONEOS || — || align=right | 1.1 km || 
|-id=062 bgcolor=#E9E9E9
| 288062 ||  || — || October 17, 2003 || Apache Point || SDSS || — || align=right | 3.4 km || 
|-id=063 bgcolor=#E9E9E9
| 288063 ||  || — || October 17, 2003 || Apache Point || SDSS || EUN || align=right | 1.6 km || 
|-id=064 bgcolor=#fefefe
| 288064 ||  || — || October 19, 2003 || Kitt Peak || Spacewatch || — || align=right data-sort-value="0.88" | 880 m || 
|-id=065 bgcolor=#fefefe
| 288065 ||  || — || October 19, 2003 || Apache Point || SDSS || — || align=right | 1.1 km || 
|-id=066 bgcolor=#fefefe
| 288066 ||  || — || October 19, 2003 || Apache Point || SDSS || — || align=right data-sort-value="0.93" | 930 m || 
|-id=067 bgcolor=#E9E9E9
| 288067 ||  || — || October 19, 2003 || Apache Point || SDSS || AGN || align=right | 1.7 km || 
|-id=068 bgcolor=#d6d6d6
| 288068 ||  || — || October 19, 2003 || Kitt Peak || Spacewatch || — || align=right | 2.3 km || 
|-id=069 bgcolor=#E9E9E9
| 288069 ||  || — || October 19, 2003 || Kitt Peak || Spacewatch || — || align=right | 2.2 km || 
|-id=070 bgcolor=#d6d6d6
| 288070 ||  || — || October 19, 2003 || Kitt Peak || Spacewatch || — || align=right | 3.0 km || 
|-id=071 bgcolor=#fefefe
| 288071 ||  || — || October 22, 2003 || Apache Point || SDSS || — || align=right data-sort-value="0.91" | 910 m || 
|-id=072 bgcolor=#d6d6d6
| 288072 ||  || — || October 22, 2003 || Apache Point || SDSS || — || align=right | 4.3 km || 
|-id=073 bgcolor=#E9E9E9
| 288073 ||  || — || October 23, 2003 || Apache Point || SDSS || — || align=right data-sort-value="0.95" | 950 m || 
|-id=074 bgcolor=#fefefe
| 288074 ||  || — || October 23, 2003 || Apache Point || SDSS || V || align=right data-sort-value="0.73" | 730 m || 
|-id=075 bgcolor=#E9E9E9
| 288075 ||  || — || October 23, 2003 || Kitt Peak || Spacewatch || HNS || align=right | 1.6 km || 
|-id=076 bgcolor=#E9E9E9
| 288076 ||  || — || October 18, 2003 || Kitt Peak || Spacewatch || — || align=right | 1.5 km || 
|-id=077 bgcolor=#fefefe
| 288077 ||  || — || October 19, 2003 || Apache Point || SDSS || — || align=right | 1.3 km || 
|-id=078 bgcolor=#fefefe
| 288078 ||  || — || November 4, 2003 || Socorro || LINEAR || — || align=right | 1.3 km || 
|-id=079 bgcolor=#E9E9E9
| 288079 ||  || — || November 15, 2003 || Kitt Peak || Spacewatch || — || align=right | 1.9 km || 
|-id=080 bgcolor=#fefefe
| 288080 ||  || — || November 15, 2003 || Kitt Peak || Spacewatch || MAS || align=right data-sort-value="0.78" | 780 m || 
|-id=081 bgcolor=#d6d6d6
| 288081 ||  || — || November 15, 2003 || Kitt Peak || Spacewatch || THM || align=right | 2.6 km || 
|-id=082 bgcolor=#E9E9E9
| 288082 ||  || — || November 15, 2003 || Palomar || NEAT || — || align=right | 1.5 km || 
|-id=083 bgcolor=#fefefe
| 288083 ||  || — || November 15, 2003 || Palomar || NEAT || FLO || align=right data-sort-value="0.81" | 810 m || 
|-id=084 bgcolor=#E9E9E9
| 288084 ||  || — || November 15, 2003 || Palomar || NEAT || WIT || align=right | 1.6 km || 
|-id=085 bgcolor=#E9E9E9
| 288085 ||  || — || November 15, 2003 || Palomar || NEAT || — || align=right | 3.2 km || 
|-id=086 bgcolor=#fefefe
| 288086 ||  || — || November 17, 2003 || Catalina || CSS || NYS || align=right data-sort-value="0.88" | 880 m || 
|-id=087 bgcolor=#E9E9E9
| 288087 ||  || — || November 16, 2003 || Kitt Peak || Spacewatch || EUN || align=right | 1.5 km || 
|-id=088 bgcolor=#E9E9E9
| 288088 ||  || — || November 18, 2003 || Palomar || NEAT || — || align=right | 2.3 km || 
|-id=089 bgcolor=#fefefe
| 288089 ||  || — || November 16, 2003 || Kitt Peak || Spacewatch || — || align=right | 1.1 km || 
|-id=090 bgcolor=#d6d6d6
| 288090 ||  || — || November 18, 2003 || Socorro || LINEAR || EUP || align=right | 7.0 km || 
|-id=091 bgcolor=#d6d6d6
| 288091 ||  || — || November 16, 2003 || Kitt Peak || Spacewatch || — || align=right | 4.7 km || 
|-id=092 bgcolor=#E9E9E9
| 288092 ||  || — || November 18, 2003 || Kitt Peak || Spacewatch || — || align=right | 1.4 km || 
|-id=093 bgcolor=#fefefe
| 288093 ||  || — || November 16, 2003 || Kitt Peak || Spacewatch || FLO || align=right data-sort-value="0.91" | 910 m || 
|-id=094 bgcolor=#E9E9E9
| 288094 ||  || — || November 16, 2003 || Kitt Peak || Spacewatch || — || align=right | 2.3 km || 
|-id=095 bgcolor=#C2FFFF
| 288095 ||  || — || November 19, 2003 || Palomar || NEAT || L5 || align=right | 11 km || 
|-id=096 bgcolor=#fefefe
| 288096 ||  || — || November 19, 2003 || Socorro || LINEAR || — || align=right | 1.0 km || 
|-id=097 bgcolor=#E9E9E9
| 288097 ||  || — || November 19, 2003 || Socorro || LINEAR || MAR || align=right | 1.6 km || 
|-id=098 bgcolor=#fefefe
| 288098 ||  || — || November 18, 2003 || Kitt Peak || Spacewatch || MAS || align=right data-sort-value="0.87" | 870 m || 
|-id=099 bgcolor=#fefefe
| 288099 ||  || — || November 18, 2003 || Kitt Peak || Spacewatch || — || align=right | 1.0 km || 
|-id=100 bgcolor=#E9E9E9
| 288100 ||  || — || November 18, 2003 || Kitt Peak || Spacewatch || — || align=right | 2.4 km || 
|}

288101–288200 

|-bgcolor=#E9E9E9
| 288101 ||  || — || November 20, 2003 || Socorro || LINEAR || — || align=right | 2.5 km || 
|-id=102 bgcolor=#E9E9E9
| 288102 ||  || — || November 19, 2003 || Catalina || CSS || — || align=right | 2.8 km || 
|-id=103 bgcolor=#E9E9E9
| 288103 ||  || — || November 19, 2003 || Kitt Peak || Spacewatch || — || align=right | 3.1 km || 
|-id=104 bgcolor=#E9E9E9
| 288104 ||  || — || November 19, 2003 || Socorro || LINEAR || — || align=right | 1.5 km || 
|-id=105 bgcolor=#fefefe
| 288105 ||  || — || November 19, 2003 || Kitt Peak || Spacewatch || — || align=right | 1.1 km || 
|-id=106 bgcolor=#E9E9E9
| 288106 ||  || — || November 18, 2003 || Palomar || NEAT || — || align=right | 1.2 km || 
|-id=107 bgcolor=#fefefe
| 288107 ||  || — || November 19, 2003 || Socorro || LINEAR || — || align=right | 1.0 km || 
|-id=108 bgcolor=#E9E9E9
| 288108 ||  || — || November 19, 2003 || Socorro || LINEAR || — || align=right | 2.9 km || 
|-id=109 bgcolor=#E9E9E9
| 288109 ||  || — || November 19, 2003 || Socorro || LINEAR || — || align=right | 1.4 km || 
|-id=110 bgcolor=#fefefe
| 288110 ||  || — || November 21, 2003 || Socorro || LINEAR || — || align=right | 1.7 km || 
|-id=111 bgcolor=#fefefe
| 288111 ||  || — || November 18, 2003 || Kitt Peak || Spacewatch || V || align=right data-sort-value="0.68" | 680 m || 
|-id=112 bgcolor=#fefefe
| 288112 ||  || — || November 18, 2003 || Palomar || NEAT || MAS || align=right data-sort-value="0.96" | 960 m || 
|-id=113 bgcolor=#E9E9E9
| 288113 ||  || — || November 19, 2003 || Kitt Peak || Spacewatch || MAR || align=right | 1.5 km || 
|-id=114 bgcolor=#fefefe
| 288114 ||  || — || November 19, 2003 || Kitt Peak || Spacewatch || NYS || align=right data-sort-value="0.74" | 740 m || 
|-id=115 bgcolor=#E9E9E9
| 288115 ||  || — || November 19, 2003 || Kitt Peak || Spacewatch || — || align=right | 1.4 km || 
|-id=116 bgcolor=#E9E9E9
| 288116 ||  || — || November 19, 2003 || Kitt Peak || Spacewatch || — || align=right | 1.6 km || 
|-id=117 bgcolor=#E9E9E9
| 288117 ||  || — || November 19, 2003 || Kitt Peak || Spacewatch || — || align=right | 1.7 km || 
|-id=118 bgcolor=#E9E9E9
| 288118 ||  || — || November 19, 2003 || Kitt Peak || Spacewatch || — || align=right | 2.3 km || 
|-id=119 bgcolor=#E9E9E9
| 288119 ||  || — || November 19, 2003 || Kitt Peak || Spacewatch || — || align=right | 1.8 km || 
|-id=120 bgcolor=#fefefe
| 288120 ||  || — || November 19, 2003 || Kitt Peak || Spacewatch || FLO || align=right data-sort-value="0.79" | 790 m || 
|-id=121 bgcolor=#fefefe
| 288121 ||  || — || November 19, 2003 || Kitt Peak || Spacewatch || — || align=right | 1.0 km || 
|-id=122 bgcolor=#fefefe
| 288122 ||  || — || November 19, 2003 || Kitt Peak || Spacewatch || — || align=right data-sort-value="0.80" | 800 m || 
|-id=123 bgcolor=#fefefe
| 288123 ||  || — || November 20, 2003 || Socorro || LINEAR || — || align=right | 1.0 km || 
|-id=124 bgcolor=#E9E9E9
| 288124 ||  || — || November 20, 2003 || Socorro || LINEAR || EUN || align=right | 1.7 km || 
|-id=125 bgcolor=#fefefe
| 288125 ||  || — || November 19, 2003 || Kitt Peak || Spacewatch || — || align=right | 1.0 km || 
|-id=126 bgcolor=#d6d6d6
| 288126 ||  || — || November 19, 2003 || Kitt Peak || Spacewatch || — || align=right | 3.6 km || 
|-id=127 bgcolor=#E9E9E9
| 288127 ||  || — || November 19, 2003 || Kitt Peak || Spacewatch || — || align=right | 2.7 km || 
|-id=128 bgcolor=#fefefe
| 288128 ||  || — || November 20, 2003 || Socorro || LINEAR || — || align=right | 1.1 km || 
|-id=129 bgcolor=#E9E9E9
| 288129 ||  || — || November 20, 2003 || Socorro || LINEAR || — || align=right | 1.7 km || 
|-id=130 bgcolor=#E9E9E9
| 288130 ||  || — || November 20, 2003 || Socorro || LINEAR || — || align=right | 1.1 km || 
|-id=131 bgcolor=#fefefe
| 288131 ||  || — || November 19, 2003 || Socorro || LINEAR || — || align=right data-sort-value="0.98" | 980 m || 
|-id=132 bgcolor=#FA8072
| 288132 ||  || — || November 19, 2003 || Socorro || LINEAR || — || align=right data-sort-value="0.77" | 770 m || 
|-id=133 bgcolor=#E9E9E9
| 288133 ||  || — || November 20, 2003 || Kitt Peak || Spacewatch || — || align=right | 1.3 km || 
|-id=134 bgcolor=#fefefe
| 288134 ||  || — || November 18, 2003 || Palomar || NEAT || — || align=right | 1.3 km || 
|-id=135 bgcolor=#fefefe
| 288135 ||  || — || November 19, 2003 || Anderson Mesa || LONEOS || — || align=right data-sort-value="0.88" | 880 m || 
|-id=136 bgcolor=#fefefe
| 288136 ||  || — || November 19, 2003 || Anderson Mesa || LONEOS || — || align=right data-sort-value="0.68" | 680 m || 
|-id=137 bgcolor=#fefefe
| 288137 ||  || — || November 19, 2003 || Anderson Mesa || LONEOS || — || align=right data-sort-value="0.74" | 740 m || 
|-id=138 bgcolor=#E9E9E9
| 288138 ||  || — || November 19, 2003 || Anderson Mesa || LONEOS || — || align=right data-sort-value="0.86" | 860 m || 
|-id=139 bgcolor=#fefefe
| 288139 ||  || — || November 20, 2003 || Socorro || LINEAR || NYS || align=right data-sort-value="0.99" | 990 m || 
|-id=140 bgcolor=#fefefe
| 288140 ||  || — || November 21, 2003 || Socorro || LINEAR || V || align=right data-sort-value="0.92" | 920 m || 
|-id=141 bgcolor=#E9E9E9
| 288141 ||  || — || November 21, 2003 || Catalina || CSS || JUN || align=right | 1.5 km || 
|-id=142 bgcolor=#fefefe
| 288142 ||  || — || November 21, 2003 || Socorro || LINEAR || FLO || align=right data-sort-value="0.86" | 860 m || 
|-id=143 bgcolor=#E9E9E9
| 288143 ||  || — || November 21, 2003 || Socorro || LINEAR || MAR || align=right | 1.5 km || 
|-id=144 bgcolor=#fefefe
| 288144 ||  || — || November 21, 2003 || Socorro || LINEAR || FLO || align=right data-sort-value="0.73" | 730 m || 
|-id=145 bgcolor=#E9E9E9
| 288145 ||  || — || November 21, 2003 || Socorro || LINEAR || — || align=right | 2.0 km || 
|-id=146 bgcolor=#E9E9E9
| 288146 ||  || — || November 21, 2003 || Socorro || LINEAR || JUN || align=right | 1.7 km || 
|-id=147 bgcolor=#E9E9E9
| 288147 ||  || — || November 20, 2003 || Socorro || LINEAR || — || align=right | 1.4 km || 
|-id=148 bgcolor=#fefefe
| 288148 ||  || — || November 20, 2003 || Socorro || LINEAR || V || align=right data-sort-value="0.73" | 730 m || 
|-id=149 bgcolor=#E9E9E9
| 288149 ||  || — || November 20, 2003 || Socorro || LINEAR || — || align=right | 1.2 km || 
|-id=150 bgcolor=#E9E9E9
| 288150 ||  || — || November 20, 2003 || Socorro || LINEAR || — || align=right | 2.8 km || 
|-id=151 bgcolor=#E9E9E9
| 288151 ||  || — || November 20, 2003 || Socorro || LINEAR || — || align=right | 1.4 km || 
|-id=152 bgcolor=#E9E9E9
| 288152 ||  || — || November 20, 2003 || Socorro || LINEAR || — || align=right | 1.8 km || 
|-id=153 bgcolor=#E9E9E9
| 288153 ||  || — || November 20, 2003 || Socorro || LINEAR || — || align=right | 1.5 km || 
|-id=154 bgcolor=#E9E9E9
| 288154 ||  || — || November 20, 2003 || Socorro || LINEAR || EUN || align=right | 1.9 km || 
|-id=155 bgcolor=#fefefe
| 288155 ||  || — || November 21, 2003 || Kitt Peak || Spacewatch || V || align=right | 1.1 km || 
|-id=156 bgcolor=#E9E9E9
| 288156 ||  || — || November 21, 2003 || Kitt Peak || Spacewatch || — || align=right | 1.9 km || 
|-id=157 bgcolor=#fefefe
| 288157 ||  || — || November 21, 2003 || Kitt Peak || Spacewatch || — || align=right data-sort-value="0.82" | 820 m || 
|-id=158 bgcolor=#E9E9E9
| 288158 ||  || — || November 21, 2003 || Socorro || LINEAR || — || align=right | 2.3 km || 
|-id=159 bgcolor=#fefefe
| 288159 ||  || — || November 21, 2003 || Socorro || LINEAR || — || align=right | 1.2 km || 
|-id=160 bgcolor=#E9E9E9
| 288160 ||  || — || November 21, 2003 || Socorro || LINEAR || — || align=right | 1.4 km || 
|-id=161 bgcolor=#E9E9E9
| 288161 ||  || — || November 21, 2003 || Socorro || LINEAR || — || align=right | 2.0 km || 
|-id=162 bgcolor=#E9E9E9
| 288162 ||  || — || November 23, 2003 || Socorro || LINEAR || — || align=right | 3.1 km || 
|-id=163 bgcolor=#E9E9E9
| 288163 ||  || — || November 24, 2003 || Palomar || NEAT || MAR || align=right | 1.5 km || 
|-id=164 bgcolor=#fefefe
| 288164 ||  || — || November 24, 2003 || Anderson Mesa || LONEOS || — || align=right data-sort-value="0.73" | 730 m || 
|-id=165 bgcolor=#E9E9E9
| 288165 ||  || — || November 24, 2003 || Anderson Mesa || LONEOS || — || align=right | 3.1 km || 
|-id=166 bgcolor=#d6d6d6
| 288166 ||  || — || November 26, 2003 || Anderson Mesa || LONEOS || — || align=right | 4.3 km || 
|-id=167 bgcolor=#fefefe
| 288167 ||  || — || November 26, 2003 || Kitt Peak || Spacewatch || — || align=right data-sort-value="0.87" | 870 m || 
|-id=168 bgcolor=#fefefe
| 288168 ||  || — || November 26, 2003 || Kitt Peak || Spacewatch || — || align=right | 1.4 km || 
|-id=169 bgcolor=#E9E9E9
| 288169 ||  || — || November 29, 2003 || Socorro || LINEAR || EUN || align=right | 1.7 km || 
|-id=170 bgcolor=#E9E9E9
| 288170 ||  || — || November 30, 2003 || Socorro || LINEAR || RAF || align=right | 1.1 km || 
|-id=171 bgcolor=#E9E9E9
| 288171 ||  || — || November 30, 2003 || Kitt Peak || Spacewatch || — || align=right | 2.8 km || 
|-id=172 bgcolor=#E9E9E9
| 288172 ||  || — || November 30, 2003 || Kitt Peak || Spacewatch || AST || align=right | 1.7 km || 
|-id=173 bgcolor=#d6d6d6
| 288173 ||  || — || November 30, 2003 || Kitt Peak || Spacewatch || — || align=right | 2.7 km || 
|-id=174 bgcolor=#fefefe
| 288174 ||  || — || November 19, 2003 || Catalina || CSS || FLO || align=right data-sort-value="0.79" | 790 m || 
|-id=175 bgcolor=#fefefe
| 288175 ||  || — || November 20, 2003 || Kitt Peak || M. W. Buie || V || align=right data-sort-value="0.77" | 770 m || 
|-id=176 bgcolor=#fefefe
| 288176 ||  || — || November 20, 2003 || Kitt Peak || M. W. Buie || — || align=right | 3.3 km || 
|-id=177 bgcolor=#E9E9E9
| 288177 ||  || — || November 20, 2003 || Palomar || NEAT || HNS || align=right | 1.7 km || 
|-id=178 bgcolor=#E9E9E9
| 288178 ||  || — || November 21, 2003 || Palomar || NEAT || JUL || align=right | 1.7 km || 
|-id=179 bgcolor=#E9E9E9
| 288179 ||  || — || November 29, 2003 || Socorro || LINEAR || — || align=right | 2.1 km || 
|-id=180 bgcolor=#E9E9E9
| 288180 ||  || — || November 20, 2003 || Kitt Peak || Spacewatch || HOF || align=right | 3.5 km || 
|-id=181 bgcolor=#E9E9E9
| 288181 ||  || — || November 24, 2003 || Socorro || LINEAR || — || align=right | 2.1 km || 
|-id=182 bgcolor=#fefefe
| 288182 ||  || — || November 19, 2003 || Anderson Mesa || LONEOS || — || align=right data-sort-value="0.87" | 870 m || 
|-id=183 bgcolor=#E9E9E9
| 288183 ||  || — || November 24, 2003 || Kitt Peak || Spacewatch || — || align=right | 1.4 km || 
|-id=184 bgcolor=#FA8072
| 288184 ||  || — || December 1, 2003 || Socorro || LINEAR || H || align=right | 1.1 km || 
|-id=185 bgcolor=#E9E9E9
| 288185 ||  || — || December 1, 2003 || Socorro || LINEAR || — || align=right | 1.9 km || 
|-id=186 bgcolor=#E9E9E9
| 288186 ||  || — || December 1, 2003 || Socorro || LINEAR || — || align=right | 2.4 km || 
|-id=187 bgcolor=#E9E9E9
| 288187 ||  || — || December 3, 2003 || Anderson Mesa || LONEOS || — || align=right | 3.8 km || 
|-id=188 bgcolor=#E9E9E9
| 288188 ||  || — || December 11, 2003 || Socorro || LINEAR || BAR || align=right | 2.0 km || 
|-id=189 bgcolor=#d6d6d6
| 288189 ||  || — || December 14, 2003 || Palomar || NEAT || — || align=right | 3.1 km || 
|-id=190 bgcolor=#fefefe
| 288190 ||  || — || December 12, 2003 || Palomar || NEAT || — || align=right data-sort-value="0.90" | 900 m || 
|-id=191 bgcolor=#E9E9E9
| 288191 ||  || — || December 14, 2003 || Kitt Peak || Spacewatch || — || align=right | 3.3 km || 
|-id=192 bgcolor=#fefefe
| 288192 ||  || — || December 15, 2003 || Kitt Peak || Spacewatch || — || align=right | 1.1 km || 
|-id=193 bgcolor=#E9E9E9
| 288193 ||  || — || December 14, 2003 || Kitt Peak || Spacewatch || EUN || align=right | 1.8 km || 
|-id=194 bgcolor=#E9E9E9
| 288194 ||  || — || December 14, 2003 || Kitt Peak || Spacewatch || HNS || align=right | 1.6 km || 
|-id=195 bgcolor=#fefefe
| 288195 ||  || — || December 1, 2003 || Kitt Peak || Spacewatch || FLO || align=right data-sort-value="0.68" | 680 m || 
|-id=196 bgcolor=#fefefe
| 288196 ||  || — || December 1, 2003 || Kitt Peak || Spacewatch || — || align=right data-sort-value="0.74" | 740 m || 
|-id=197 bgcolor=#E9E9E9
| 288197 ||  || — || December 14, 2003 || Kitt Peak || Spacewatch || — || align=right | 2.2 km || 
|-id=198 bgcolor=#E9E9E9
| 288198 ||  || — || December 18, 2003 || Desert Eagle || W. K. Y. Yeung || — || align=right | 2.7 km || 
|-id=199 bgcolor=#E9E9E9
| 288199 ||  || — || December 19, 2003 || Kingsnake || J. V. McClusky || — || align=right | 2.9 km || 
|-id=200 bgcolor=#d6d6d6
| 288200 ||  || — || December 16, 2003 || Catalina || CSS || EUP || align=right | 6.0 km || 
|}

288201–288300 

|-bgcolor=#E9E9E9
| 288201 ||  || — || December 16, 2003 || Anderson Mesa || LONEOS || HNS || align=right | 1.9 km || 
|-id=202 bgcolor=#E9E9E9
| 288202 ||  || — || December 17, 2003 || Socorro || LINEAR || DOR || align=right | 3.4 km || 
|-id=203 bgcolor=#E9E9E9
| 288203 ||  || — || December 17, 2003 || Socorro || LINEAR || — || align=right | 2.3 km || 
|-id=204 bgcolor=#d6d6d6
| 288204 ||  || — || December 17, 2003 || Socorro || LINEAR || 7:4 || align=right | 5.4 km || 
|-id=205 bgcolor=#E9E9E9
| 288205 ||  || — || December 17, 2003 || Anderson Mesa || LONEOS || — || align=right | 3.4 km || 
|-id=206 bgcolor=#E9E9E9
| 288206 ||  || — || December 17, 2003 || Kitt Peak || Spacewatch || EUN || align=right | 1.8 km || 
|-id=207 bgcolor=#E9E9E9
| 288207 ||  || — || December 18, 2003 || Socorro || LINEAR || — || align=right | 1.9 km || 
|-id=208 bgcolor=#E9E9E9
| 288208 ||  || — || December 18, 2003 || Socorro || LINEAR || — || align=right | 2.6 km || 
|-id=209 bgcolor=#fefefe
| 288209 ||  || — || December 17, 2003 || Kitt Peak || Spacewatch || — || align=right | 1.1 km || 
|-id=210 bgcolor=#E9E9E9
| 288210 ||  || — || December 18, 2003 || Socorro || LINEAR || — || align=right | 1.1 km || 
|-id=211 bgcolor=#fefefe
| 288211 ||  || — || December 18, 2003 || Socorro || LINEAR || — || align=right | 1.1 km || 
|-id=212 bgcolor=#fefefe
| 288212 ||  || — || December 18, 2003 || Socorro || LINEAR || NYS || align=right data-sort-value="0.88" | 880 m || 
|-id=213 bgcolor=#E9E9E9
| 288213 ||  || — || December 17, 2003 || Kitt Peak || Spacewatch || — || align=right | 2.1 km || 
|-id=214 bgcolor=#E9E9E9
| 288214 ||  || — || December 17, 2003 || Kitt Peak || Spacewatch || ADE || align=right | 2.5 km || 
|-id=215 bgcolor=#d6d6d6
| 288215 ||  || — || December 18, 2003 || Socorro || LINEAR || EOS || align=right | 3.0 km || 
|-id=216 bgcolor=#fefefe
| 288216 ||  || — || December 19, 2003 || Kitt Peak || Spacewatch || V || align=right data-sort-value="0.83" | 830 m || 
|-id=217 bgcolor=#E9E9E9
| 288217 ||  || — || December 19, 2003 || Kitt Peak || Spacewatch || — || align=right | 2.1 km || 
|-id=218 bgcolor=#fefefe
| 288218 ||  || — || December 19, 2003 || Kitt Peak || Spacewatch || — || align=right data-sort-value="0.85" | 850 m || 
|-id=219 bgcolor=#d6d6d6
| 288219 ||  || — || December 19, 2003 || Kitt Peak || Spacewatch || — || align=right | 4.2 km || 
|-id=220 bgcolor=#fefefe
| 288220 ||  || — || December 20, 2003 || Socorro || LINEAR || V || align=right data-sort-value="0.91" | 910 m || 
|-id=221 bgcolor=#d6d6d6
| 288221 ||  || — || December 17, 2003 || Kitt Peak || Spacewatch || — || align=right | 3.7 km || 
|-id=222 bgcolor=#E9E9E9
| 288222 ||  || — || December 19, 2003 || Socorro || LINEAR || — || align=right | 1.7 km || 
|-id=223 bgcolor=#fefefe
| 288223 ||  || — || December 19, 2003 || Socorro || LINEAR || — || align=right | 1.3 km || 
|-id=224 bgcolor=#fefefe
| 288224 ||  || — || December 19, 2003 || Kitt Peak || Spacewatch || EUT || align=right data-sort-value="0.71" | 710 m || 
|-id=225 bgcolor=#E9E9E9
| 288225 ||  || — || December 19, 2003 || Socorro || LINEAR || — || align=right | 1.8 km || 
|-id=226 bgcolor=#E9E9E9
| 288226 ||  || — || December 19, 2003 || Kitt Peak || Spacewatch || — || align=right | 2.0 km || 
|-id=227 bgcolor=#E9E9E9
| 288227 ||  || — || December 19, 2003 || Kitt Peak || Spacewatch || — || align=right | 1.3 km || 
|-id=228 bgcolor=#fefefe
| 288228 ||  || — || December 21, 2003 || Kitt Peak || Spacewatch || — || align=right data-sort-value="0.81" | 810 m || 
|-id=229 bgcolor=#E9E9E9
| 288229 ||  || — || December 21, 2003 || Kitt Peak || Spacewatch || — || align=right | 1.3 km || 
|-id=230 bgcolor=#fefefe
| 288230 ||  || — || December 18, 2003 || Socorro || LINEAR || NYS || align=right data-sort-value="0.79" | 790 m || 
|-id=231 bgcolor=#E9E9E9
| 288231 ||  || — || December 18, 2003 || Socorro || LINEAR || HNS || align=right | 1.8 km || 
|-id=232 bgcolor=#E9E9E9
| 288232 ||  || — || December 18, 2003 || Socorro || LINEAR || EUN || align=right | 1.7 km || 
|-id=233 bgcolor=#E9E9E9
| 288233 ||  || — || December 18, 2003 || Socorro || LINEAR || — || align=right | 2.1 km || 
|-id=234 bgcolor=#d6d6d6
| 288234 ||  || — || December 18, 2003 || Socorro || LINEAR || — || align=right | 3.6 km || 
|-id=235 bgcolor=#E9E9E9
| 288235 ||  || — || December 18, 2003 || Socorro || LINEAR || — || align=right | 3.3 km || 
|-id=236 bgcolor=#E9E9E9
| 288236 ||  || — || December 18, 2003 || Socorro || LINEAR || — || align=right | 1.6 km || 
|-id=237 bgcolor=#fefefe
| 288237 ||  || — || December 18, 2003 || Socorro || LINEAR || — || align=right | 1.1 km || 
|-id=238 bgcolor=#E9E9E9
| 288238 ||  || — || December 19, 2003 || Socorro || LINEAR || GER || align=right | 2.0 km || 
|-id=239 bgcolor=#E9E9E9
| 288239 ||  || — || December 20, 2003 || Socorro || LINEAR || — || align=right | 4.0 km || 
|-id=240 bgcolor=#d6d6d6
| 288240 ||  || — || December 21, 2003 || Kitt Peak || Spacewatch || — || align=right | 4.8 km || 
|-id=241 bgcolor=#d6d6d6
| 288241 ||  || — || December 22, 2003 || Socorro || LINEAR || BRA || align=right | 2.6 km || 
|-id=242 bgcolor=#fefefe
| 288242 ||  || — || December 19, 2003 || Socorro || LINEAR || NYS || align=right data-sort-value="0.82" | 820 m || 
|-id=243 bgcolor=#fefefe
| 288243 ||  || — || December 19, 2003 || Socorro || LINEAR || NYS || align=right data-sort-value="0.76" | 760 m || 
|-id=244 bgcolor=#fefefe
| 288244 ||  || — || December 19, 2003 || Socorro || LINEAR || NYS || align=right data-sort-value="0.96" | 960 m || 
|-id=245 bgcolor=#fefefe
| 288245 ||  || — || December 19, 2003 || Socorro || LINEAR || — || align=right | 1.1 km || 
|-id=246 bgcolor=#fefefe
| 288246 ||  || — || December 22, 2003 || Socorro || LINEAR || — || align=right | 2.3 km || 
|-id=247 bgcolor=#E9E9E9
| 288247 ||  || — || December 23, 2003 || Socorro || LINEAR || — || align=right | 1.3 km || 
|-id=248 bgcolor=#E9E9E9
| 288248 ||  || — || December 23, 2003 || Socorro || LINEAR || — || align=right | 1.8 km || 
|-id=249 bgcolor=#E9E9E9
| 288249 ||  || — || December 23, 2003 || Socorro || LINEAR || — || align=right | 1.5 km || 
|-id=250 bgcolor=#E9E9E9
| 288250 ||  || — || December 27, 2003 || Kitt Peak || Spacewatch || — || align=right | 1.6 km || 
|-id=251 bgcolor=#d6d6d6
| 288251 ||  || — || December 27, 2003 || Socorro || LINEAR || — || align=right | 3.6 km || 
|-id=252 bgcolor=#E9E9E9
| 288252 ||  || — || December 27, 2003 || Socorro || LINEAR || — || align=right | 2.2 km || 
|-id=253 bgcolor=#fefefe
| 288253 ||  || — || December 27, 2003 || Socorro || LINEAR || NYS || align=right data-sort-value="0.89" | 890 m || 
|-id=254 bgcolor=#fefefe
| 288254 ||  || — || December 29, 2003 || Socorro || LINEAR || H || align=right data-sort-value="0.73" | 730 m || 
|-id=255 bgcolor=#fefefe
| 288255 ||  || — || December 27, 2003 || Socorro || LINEAR || — || align=right | 1.4 km || 
|-id=256 bgcolor=#d6d6d6
| 288256 ||  || — || December 27, 2003 || Socorro || LINEAR || — || align=right | 4.3 km || 
|-id=257 bgcolor=#E9E9E9
| 288257 ||  || — || December 27, 2003 || Socorro || LINEAR || JUN || align=right | 1.4 km || 
|-id=258 bgcolor=#E9E9E9
| 288258 ||  || — || December 28, 2003 || Kitt Peak || Spacewatch || — || align=right | 1.4 km || 
|-id=259 bgcolor=#E9E9E9
| 288259 ||  || — || December 27, 2003 || Socorro || LINEAR || fast? || align=right | 3.0 km || 
|-id=260 bgcolor=#fefefe
| 288260 ||  || — || December 27, 2003 || Socorro || LINEAR || MAS || align=right | 1.1 km || 
|-id=261 bgcolor=#fefefe
| 288261 ||  || — || December 28, 2003 || Socorro || LINEAR || — || align=right | 1.6 km || 
|-id=262 bgcolor=#d6d6d6
| 288262 ||  || — || December 28, 2003 || Socorro || LINEAR || — || align=right | 3.9 km || 
|-id=263 bgcolor=#E9E9E9
| 288263 ||  || — || December 28, 2003 || Socorro || LINEAR || — || align=right | 3.7 km || 
|-id=264 bgcolor=#d6d6d6
| 288264 ||  || — || December 28, 2003 || Socorro || LINEAR || — || align=right | 4.3 km || 
|-id=265 bgcolor=#d6d6d6
| 288265 ||  || — || December 29, 2003 || Catalina || CSS || EOS || align=right | 2.4 km || 
|-id=266 bgcolor=#E9E9E9
| 288266 ||  || — || December 29, 2003 || Socorro || LINEAR || EUN || align=right | 2.0 km || 
|-id=267 bgcolor=#d6d6d6
| 288267 ||  || — || December 23, 2003 || Socorro || LINEAR || — || align=right | 2.6 km || 
|-id=268 bgcolor=#E9E9E9
| 288268 ||  || — || December 16, 2003 || Kitt Peak || Spacewatch || DOR || align=right | 3.1 km || 
|-id=269 bgcolor=#E9E9E9
| 288269 ||  || — || December 17, 2003 || Socorro || LINEAR || — || align=right | 5.2 km || 
|-id=270 bgcolor=#fefefe
| 288270 ||  || — || December 17, 2003 || Kitt Peak || Spacewatch || V || align=right data-sort-value="0.74" | 740 m || 
|-id=271 bgcolor=#E9E9E9
| 288271 ||  || — || December 17, 2003 || Socorro || LINEAR || EUN || align=right | 2.0 km || 
|-id=272 bgcolor=#fefefe
| 288272 ||  || — || December 17, 2003 || Kitt Peak || Spacewatch || — || align=right data-sort-value="0.75" | 750 m || 
|-id=273 bgcolor=#E9E9E9
| 288273 ||  || — || December 17, 2003 || Kitt Peak || Spacewatch || BRG || align=right | 1.9 km || 
|-id=274 bgcolor=#E9E9E9
| 288274 ||  || — || December 17, 2003 || Kitt Peak || Spacewatch || — || align=right | 2.6 km || 
|-id=275 bgcolor=#d6d6d6
| 288275 ||  || — || December 18, 2003 || Socorro || LINEAR || — || align=right | 3.9 km || 
|-id=276 bgcolor=#d6d6d6
| 288276 ||  || — || December 18, 2003 || Kitt Peak || Spacewatch || EMA || align=right | 5.4 km || 
|-id=277 bgcolor=#E9E9E9
| 288277 ||  || — || December 18, 2003 || Kitt Peak || Spacewatch || — || align=right | 2.9 km || 
|-id=278 bgcolor=#E9E9E9
| 288278 ||  || — || December 19, 2003 || Kitt Peak || Spacewatch || AGN || align=right | 1.3 km || 
|-id=279 bgcolor=#E9E9E9
| 288279 ||  || — || January 12, 2004 || Palomar || NEAT || — || align=right | 3.0 km || 
|-id=280 bgcolor=#fefefe
| 288280 ||  || — || January 13, 2004 || Anderson Mesa || LONEOS || LCI || align=right | 1.4 km || 
|-id=281 bgcolor=#fefefe
| 288281 ||  || — || January 13, 2004 || Anderson Mesa || LONEOS || FLO || align=right data-sort-value="0.68" | 680 m || 
|-id=282 bgcolor=#C2FFFF
| 288282 ||  || — || January 15, 2004 || Kitt Peak || Spacewatch || L5 || align=right | 15 km || 
|-id=283 bgcolor=#E9E9E9
| 288283 ||  || — || January 15, 2004 || Kitt Peak || Spacewatch || — || align=right | 4.3 km || 
|-id=284 bgcolor=#E9E9E9
| 288284 ||  || — || January 15, 2004 || Kitt Peak || Spacewatch || HNS || align=right | 1.8 km || 
|-id=285 bgcolor=#d6d6d6
| 288285 ||  || — || January 13, 2004 || Anderson Mesa || LONEOS || HYG || align=right | 3.8 km || 
|-id=286 bgcolor=#d6d6d6
| 288286 ||  || — || January 13, 2004 || Kitt Peak || Spacewatch || EOS || align=right | 4.1 km || 
|-id=287 bgcolor=#E9E9E9
| 288287 ||  || — || January 13, 2004 || Kitt Peak || Spacewatch || — || align=right | 2.4 km || 
|-id=288 bgcolor=#E9E9E9
| 288288 ||  || — || January 15, 2004 || Kitt Peak || Spacewatch || — || align=right | 1.5 km || 
|-id=289 bgcolor=#E9E9E9
| 288289 ||  || — || January 15, 2004 || Kitt Peak || Spacewatch || HOF || align=right | 2.7 km || 
|-id=290 bgcolor=#fefefe
| 288290 ||  || — || January 15, 2004 || Kitt Peak || Spacewatch || — || align=right | 1.2 km || 
|-id=291 bgcolor=#E9E9E9
| 288291 ||  || — || January 15, 2004 || Kitt Peak || Spacewatch || — || align=right | 1.6 km || 
|-id=292 bgcolor=#fefefe
| 288292 ||  || — || January 15, 2004 || Kitt Peak || Spacewatch || V || align=right | 1.1 km || 
|-id=293 bgcolor=#d6d6d6
| 288293 ||  || — || January 15, 2004 || Kitt Peak || Spacewatch || — || align=right | 2.4 km || 
|-id=294 bgcolor=#E9E9E9
| 288294 ||  || — || January 16, 2004 || Kitt Peak || Spacewatch || — || align=right | 2.3 km || 
|-id=295 bgcolor=#E9E9E9
| 288295 ||  || — || January 16, 2004 || Kitt Peak || Spacewatch || — || align=right | 2.1 km || 
|-id=296 bgcolor=#fefefe
| 288296 ||  || — || January 16, 2004 || Kitt Peak || Spacewatch || — || align=right data-sort-value="0.97" | 970 m || 
|-id=297 bgcolor=#E9E9E9
| 288297 ||  || — || January 17, 2004 || Kitt Peak || Spacewatch || — || align=right | 1.2 km || 
|-id=298 bgcolor=#E9E9E9
| 288298 ||  || — || January 16, 2004 || Palomar || NEAT || — || align=right | 1.6 km || 
|-id=299 bgcolor=#fefefe
| 288299 ||  || — || January 16, 2004 || Palomar || NEAT || H || align=right data-sort-value="0.76" | 760 m || 
|-id=300 bgcolor=#E9E9E9
| 288300 ||  || — || January 17, 2004 || Haleakala || NEAT || GEF || align=right | 2.1 km || 
|}

288301–288400 

|-bgcolor=#E9E9E9
| 288301 ||  || — || January 18, 2004 || Palomar || NEAT || — || align=right | 1.5 km || 
|-id=302 bgcolor=#E9E9E9
| 288302 ||  || — || January 16, 2004 || Kitt Peak || Spacewatch || — || align=right | 1.7 km || 
|-id=303 bgcolor=#E9E9E9
| 288303 ||  || — || January 18, 2004 || Palomar || NEAT || — || align=right | 3.2 km || 
|-id=304 bgcolor=#E9E9E9
| 288304 ||  || — || January 17, 2004 || Palomar || NEAT || — || align=right | 3.0 km || 
|-id=305 bgcolor=#E9E9E9
| 288305 ||  || — || January 17, 2004 || Haleakala || NEAT || — || align=right | 2.4 km || 
|-id=306 bgcolor=#d6d6d6
| 288306 ||  || — || January 18, 2004 || Needville || J. Dellinger || TIR || align=right | 2.9 km || 
|-id=307 bgcolor=#E9E9E9
| 288307 ||  || — || January 19, 2004 || Anderson Mesa || LONEOS || — || align=right | 3.3 km || 
|-id=308 bgcolor=#E9E9E9
| 288308 ||  || — || January 19, 2004 || Kitt Peak || Spacewatch || JUN || align=right | 1.6 km || 
|-id=309 bgcolor=#d6d6d6
| 288309 ||  || — || January 19, 2004 || Kitt Peak || Spacewatch || — || align=right | 2.5 km || 
|-id=310 bgcolor=#E9E9E9
| 288310 ||  || — || January 19, 2004 || Kitt Peak || Spacewatch || HOF || align=right | 2.9 km || 
|-id=311 bgcolor=#E9E9E9
| 288311 ||  || — || January 19, 2004 || Kitt Peak || Spacewatch || HEN || align=right | 1.3 km || 
|-id=312 bgcolor=#E9E9E9
| 288312 ||  || — || January 19, 2004 || Kitt Peak || Spacewatch || — || align=right | 3.0 km || 
|-id=313 bgcolor=#E9E9E9
| 288313 ||  || — || January 19, 2004 || Kitt Peak || Spacewatch || — || align=right | 2.5 km || 
|-id=314 bgcolor=#fefefe
| 288314 ||  || — || January 19, 2004 || Kitt Peak || Spacewatch || V || align=right data-sort-value="0.91" | 910 m || 
|-id=315 bgcolor=#E9E9E9
| 288315 ||  || — || January 19, 2004 || Kitt Peak || Spacewatch || — || align=right data-sort-value="0.95" | 950 m || 
|-id=316 bgcolor=#C2FFFF
| 288316 ||  || — || January 21, 2004 || Socorro || LINEAR || L5 || align=right | 15 km || 
|-id=317 bgcolor=#fefefe
| 288317 ||  || — || January 21, 2004 || Socorro || LINEAR || V || align=right data-sort-value="0.98" | 980 m || 
|-id=318 bgcolor=#fefefe
| 288318 ||  || — || January 21, 2004 || Socorro || LINEAR || ERI || align=right | 1.6 km || 
|-id=319 bgcolor=#E9E9E9
| 288319 ||  || — || January 21, 2004 || Socorro || LINEAR || NEM || align=right | 3.1 km || 
|-id=320 bgcolor=#E9E9E9
| 288320 ||  || — || January 21, 2004 || Socorro || LINEAR || — || align=right | 3.2 km || 
|-id=321 bgcolor=#E9E9E9
| 288321 ||  || — || January 22, 2004 || Socorro || LINEAR || AGN || align=right | 1.4 km || 
|-id=322 bgcolor=#fefefe
| 288322 ||  || — || January 22, 2004 || Socorro || LINEAR || FLO || align=right data-sort-value="0.92" | 920 m || 
|-id=323 bgcolor=#d6d6d6
| 288323 ||  || — || January 22, 2004 || Socorro || LINEAR || ALA || align=right | 6.0 km || 
|-id=324 bgcolor=#FA8072
| 288324 ||  || — || January 24, 2004 || Socorro || LINEAR || — || align=right | 1.1 km || 
|-id=325 bgcolor=#E9E9E9
| 288325 ||  || — || January 21, 2004 || Socorro || LINEAR || — || align=right | 2.9 km || 
|-id=326 bgcolor=#fefefe
| 288326 ||  || — || January 21, 2004 || Socorro || LINEAR || NYS || align=right data-sort-value="0.58" | 580 m || 
|-id=327 bgcolor=#fefefe
| 288327 ||  || — || January 22, 2004 || Socorro || LINEAR || MAS || align=right data-sort-value="0.81" | 810 m || 
|-id=328 bgcolor=#E9E9E9
| 288328 ||  || — || January 22, 2004 || Socorro || LINEAR || AGN || align=right | 1.6 km || 
|-id=329 bgcolor=#E9E9E9
| 288329 ||  || — || January 22, 2004 || Socorro || LINEAR || — || align=right | 2.0 km || 
|-id=330 bgcolor=#d6d6d6
| 288330 ||  || — || January 24, 2004 || Socorro || LINEAR || HYG || align=right | 3.9 km || 
|-id=331 bgcolor=#fefefe
| 288331 ||  || — || January 16, 2004 || Palomar || NEAT || H || align=right data-sort-value="0.94" | 940 m || 
|-id=332 bgcolor=#E9E9E9
| 288332 ||  || — || January 22, 2004 || Socorro || LINEAR || — || align=right | 2.1 km || 
|-id=333 bgcolor=#E9E9E9
| 288333 ||  || — || January 22, 2004 || Socorro || LINEAR || — || align=right | 2.3 km || 
|-id=334 bgcolor=#E9E9E9
| 288334 ||  || — || January 22, 2004 || Socorro || LINEAR || NEM || align=right | 2.5 km || 
|-id=335 bgcolor=#E9E9E9
| 288335 ||  || — || January 24, 2004 || Socorro || LINEAR || — || align=right | 1.9 km || 
|-id=336 bgcolor=#E9E9E9
| 288336 ||  || — || January 24, 2004 || Socorro || LINEAR || — || align=right | 1.3 km || 
|-id=337 bgcolor=#E9E9E9
| 288337 ||  || — || January 23, 2004 || Socorro || LINEAR || — || align=right | 3.7 km || 
|-id=338 bgcolor=#d6d6d6
| 288338 ||  || — || January 23, 2004 || Socorro || LINEAR || — || align=right | 4.8 km || 
|-id=339 bgcolor=#E9E9E9
| 288339 ||  || — || January 28, 2004 || Socorro || LINEAR || MAR || align=right | 1.8 km || 
|-id=340 bgcolor=#E9E9E9
| 288340 ||  || — || January 27, 2004 || Kitt Peak || Spacewatch || DOR || align=right | 4.0 km || 
|-id=341 bgcolor=#E9E9E9
| 288341 ||  || — || January 27, 2004 || Kitt Peak || Spacewatch || — || align=right | 2.2 km || 
|-id=342 bgcolor=#E9E9E9
| 288342 ||  || — || January 23, 2004 || Socorro || LINEAR || HNS || align=right | 1.6 km || 
|-id=343 bgcolor=#E9E9E9
| 288343 ||  || — || January 29, 2004 || Catalina || CSS || — || align=right | 3.0 km || 
|-id=344 bgcolor=#E9E9E9
| 288344 ||  || — || January 28, 2004 || Catalina || CSS || HNS || align=right | 1.6 km || 
|-id=345 bgcolor=#E9E9E9
| 288345 ||  || — || January 30, 2004 || Catalina || CSS || — || align=right | 1.9 km || 
|-id=346 bgcolor=#d6d6d6
| 288346 ||  || — || January 16, 2004 || Palomar || NEAT || — || align=right | 3.7 km || 
|-id=347 bgcolor=#fefefe
| 288347 ||  || — || January 16, 2004 || Kitt Peak || Spacewatch || — || align=right data-sort-value="0.67" | 670 m || 
|-id=348 bgcolor=#fefefe
| 288348 ||  || — || January 16, 2004 || Kitt Peak || Spacewatch || — || align=right data-sort-value="0.75" | 750 m || 
|-id=349 bgcolor=#d6d6d6
| 288349 ||  || — || January 17, 2004 || Palomar || NEAT || — || align=right | 3.1 km || 
|-id=350 bgcolor=#E9E9E9
| 288350 ||  || — || January 19, 2004 || Kitt Peak || Spacewatch || HEN || align=right | 1.3 km || 
|-id=351 bgcolor=#E9E9E9
| 288351 ||  || — || January 19, 2004 || Kitt Peak || Spacewatch || — || align=right | 1.7 km || 
|-id=352 bgcolor=#E9E9E9
| 288352 ||  || — || January 21, 2004 || Socorro || LINEAR || GER || align=right | 1.8 km || 
|-id=353 bgcolor=#d6d6d6
| 288353 ||  || — || January 22, 2004 || Socorro || LINEAR || — || align=right | 4.0 km || 
|-id=354 bgcolor=#E9E9E9
| 288354 ||  || — || January 22, 2004 || Socorro || LINEAR || — || align=right | 2.1 km || 
|-id=355 bgcolor=#E9E9E9
| 288355 ||  || — || January 16, 2004 || Palomar || NEAT || WIT || align=right | 1.4 km || 
|-id=356 bgcolor=#d6d6d6
| 288356 ||  || — || January 28, 2004 || Kitt Peak || Spacewatch || — || align=right | 3.2 km || 
|-id=357 bgcolor=#fefefe
| 288357 ||  || — || January 28, 2004 || Kitt Peak || Spacewatch || NYS || align=right data-sort-value="0.52" | 520 m || 
|-id=358 bgcolor=#E9E9E9
| 288358 ||  || — || February 2, 2004 || Socorro || LINEAR || EUN || align=right | 1.8 km || 
|-id=359 bgcolor=#fefefe
| 288359 ||  || — || February 10, 2004 || Palomar || NEAT || V || align=right data-sort-value="0.98" | 980 m || 
|-id=360 bgcolor=#d6d6d6
| 288360 ||  || — || February 11, 2004 || Kitt Peak || Spacewatch || — || align=right | 2.7 km || 
|-id=361 bgcolor=#E9E9E9
| 288361 ||  || — || February 11, 2004 || Palomar || NEAT || — || align=right | 3.9 km || 
|-id=362 bgcolor=#fefefe
| 288362 ||  || — || February 11, 2004 || Palomar || NEAT || — || align=right data-sort-value="0.93" | 930 m || 
|-id=363 bgcolor=#fefefe
| 288363 ||  || — || February 11, 2004 || Palomar || NEAT || — || align=right data-sort-value="0.91" | 910 m || 
|-id=364 bgcolor=#E9E9E9
| 288364 ||  || — || February 11, 2004 || Palomar || NEAT || — || align=right | 2.0 km || 
|-id=365 bgcolor=#d6d6d6
| 288365 ||  || — || February 11, 2004 || Palomar || NEAT || EOS || align=right | 3.6 km || 
|-id=366 bgcolor=#fefefe
| 288366 ||  || — || February 11, 2004 || Kitt Peak || Spacewatch || NYS || align=right data-sort-value="0.89" | 890 m || 
|-id=367 bgcolor=#d6d6d6
| 288367 ||  || — || February 11, 2004 || Palomar || NEAT || — || align=right | 4.1 km || 
|-id=368 bgcolor=#fefefe
| 288368 ||  || — || February 10, 2004 || Catalina || CSS || MAS || align=right data-sort-value="0.86" | 860 m || 
|-id=369 bgcolor=#E9E9E9
| 288369 ||  || — || February 11, 2004 || Kitt Peak || Spacewatch || — || align=right | 2.0 km || 
|-id=370 bgcolor=#E9E9E9
| 288370 ||  || — || February 11, 2004 || Kitt Peak || Spacewatch || — || align=right | 1.7 km || 
|-id=371 bgcolor=#d6d6d6
| 288371 ||  || — || February 11, 2004 || Kitt Peak || Spacewatch || — || align=right | 3.1 km || 
|-id=372 bgcolor=#E9E9E9
| 288372 ||  || — || February 12, 2004 || Kitt Peak || Spacewatch || MRX || align=right | 1.2 km || 
|-id=373 bgcolor=#E9E9E9
| 288373 ||  || — || February 12, 2004 || Palomar || NEAT || — || align=right | 2.9 km || 
|-id=374 bgcolor=#d6d6d6
| 288374 ||  || — || February 11, 2004 || Kitt Peak || Spacewatch || VER || align=right | 4.1 km || 
|-id=375 bgcolor=#d6d6d6
| 288375 ||  || — || February 12, 2004 || Kitt Peak || Spacewatch || — || align=right | 2.2 km || 
|-id=376 bgcolor=#d6d6d6
| 288376 ||  || — || February 12, 2004 || Kitt Peak || Spacewatch || — || align=right | 4.5 km || 
|-id=377 bgcolor=#d6d6d6
| 288377 ||  || — || February 11, 2004 || Palomar || NEAT || — || align=right | 5.5 km || 
|-id=378 bgcolor=#d6d6d6
| 288378 ||  || — || February 10, 2004 || Palomar || NEAT || EUP || align=right | 6.6 km || 
|-id=379 bgcolor=#fefefe
| 288379 ||  || — || February 11, 2004 || Palomar || NEAT || H || align=right data-sort-value="0.73" | 730 m || 
|-id=380 bgcolor=#d6d6d6
| 288380 ||  || — || February 11, 2004 || Palomar || NEAT || — || align=right | 3.7 km || 
|-id=381 bgcolor=#fefefe
| 288381 ||  || — || February 11, 2004 || Kitt Peak || Spacewatch || — || align=right data-sort-value="0.98" | 980 m || 
|-id=382 bgcolor=#E9E9E9
| 288382 ||  || — || February 15, 2004 || Haleakala || NEAT || — || align=right | 2.4 km || 
|-id=383 bgcolor=#E9E9E9
| 288383 ||  || — || February 11, 2004 || Catalina || CSS || — || align=right | 1.2 km || 
|-id=384 bgcolor=#fefefe
| 288384 ||  || — || February 11, 2004 || Kitt Peak || Spacewatch || V || align=right | 1.1 km || 
|-id=385 bgcolor=#E9E9E9
| 288385 ||  || — || February 11, 2004 || Kitt Peak || Spacewatch || MRX || align=right | 1.5 km || 
|-id=386 bgcolor=#fefefe
| 288386 ||  || — || February 11, 2004 || Kitt Peak || Spacewatch || — || align=right | 1.2 km || 
|-id=387 bgcolor=#d6d6d6
| 288387 ||  || — || February 11, 2004 || Kitt Peak || Spacewatch || EOS || align=right | 3.5 km || 
|-id=388 bgcolor=#E9E9E9
| 288388 ||  || — || February 12, 2004 || Kitt Peak || Spacewatch || — || align=right | 2.1 km || 
|-id=389 bgcolor=#E9E9E9
| 288389 ||  || — || February 12, 2004 || Kitt Peak || Spacewatch || HNA || align=right | 2.7 km || 
|-id=390 bgcolor=#d6d6d6
| 288390 ||  || — || February 12, 2004 || Kitt Peak || Spacewatch || — || align=right | 2.9 km || 
|-id=391 bgcolor=#fefefe
| 288391 ||  || — || February 14, 2004 || Kitt Peak || Spacewatch || MAS || align=right data-sort-value="0.88" | 880 m || 
|-id=392 bgcolor=#E9E9E9
| 288392 ||  || — || February 11, 2004 || Kitt Peak || Spacewatch || — || align=right | 2.1 km || 
|-id=393 bgcolor=#E9E9E9
| 288393 ||  || — || February 13, 2004 || Palomar || NEAT || ADE || align=right | 2.8 km || 
|-id=394 bgcolor=#E9E9E9
| 288394 ||  || — || February 14, 2004 || Anderson Mesa || LONEOS || JUN || align=right | 1.5 km || 
|-id=395 bgcolor=#E9E9E9
| 288395 ||  || — || February 11, 2004 || Kitt Peak || Spacewatch || HEN || align=right | 1.4 km || 
|-id=396 bgcolor=#E9E9E9
| 288396 ||  || — || February 12, 2004 || Kitt Peak || Spacewatch || — || align=right | 1.9 km || 
|-id=397 bgcolor=#E9E9E9
| 288397 ||  || — || February 12, 2004 || Kitt Peak || Spacewatch || — || align=right data-sort-value="0.87" | 870 m || 
|-id=398 bgcolor=#fefefe
| 288398 ||  || — || February 12, 2004 || Kitt Peak || Spacewatch || — || align=right data-sort-value="0.94" | 940 m || 
|-id=399 bgcolor=#fefefe
| 288399 ||  || — || February 12, 2004 || Kitt Peak || Spacewatch || — || align=right data-sort-value="0.93" | 930 m || 
|-id=400 bgcolor=#E9E9E9
| 288400 ||  || — || February 16, 2004 || Socorro || LINEAR || — || align=right | 4.2 km || 
|}

288401–288500 

|-bgcolor=#d6d6d6
| 288401 ||  || — || February 16, 2004 || Kitt Peak || Spacewatch || — || align=right | 4.2 km || 
|-id=402 bgcolor=#d6d6d6
| 288402 ||  || — || February 16, 2004 || Catalina || CSS || — || align=right | 5.1 km || 
|-id=403 bgcolor=#E9E9E9
| 288403 ||  || — || February 17, 2004 || Palomar || NEAT || — || align=right | 2.5 km || 
|-id=404 bgcolor=#fefefe
| 288404 ||  || — || February 18, 2004 || Kitt Peak || Spacewatch || V || align=right data-sort-value="0.78" | 780 m || 
|-id=405 bgcolor=#d6d6d6
| 288405 ||  || — || February 17, 2004 || Catalina || CSS || — || align=right | 3.0 km || 
|-id=406 bgcolor=#E9E9E9
| 288406 ||  || — || February 17, 2004 || Catalina || CSS || — || align=right | 4.3 km || 
|-id=407 bgcolor=#fefefe
| 288407 ||  || — || February 16, 2004 || Kitt Peak || Spacewatch || — || align=right data-sort-value="0.91" | 910 m || 
|-id=408 bgcolor=#d6d6d6
| 288408 ||  || — || February 17, 2004 || Kitt Peak || Spacewatch || THM || align=right | 3.1 km || 
|-id=409 bgcolor=#E9E9E9
| 288409 ||  || — || February 17, 2004 || Kitt Peak || Spacewatch || — || align=right | 2.0 km || 
|-id=410 bgcolor=#d6d6d6
| 288410 ||  || — || February 18, 2004 || Socorro || LINEAR || — || align=right | 4.2 km || 
|-id=411 bgcolor=#E9E9E9
| 288411 ||  || — || February 19, 2004 || Socorro || LINEAR || — || align=right | 3.1 km || 
|-id=412 bgcolor=#d6d6d6
| 288412 ||  || — || February 19, 2004 || Socorro || LINEAR || — || align=right | 3.2 km || 
|-id=413 bgcolor=#E9E9E9
| 288413 ||  || — || February 23, 2004 || Socorro || LINEAR || — || align=right | 1.7 km || 
|-id=414 bgcolor=#E9E9E9
| 288414 ||  || — || February 19, 2004 || Socorro || LINEAR || HNS || align=right | 1.6 km || 
|-id=415 bgcolor=#E9E9E9
| 288415 ||  || — || February 23, 2004 || Socorro || LINEAR || — || align=right | 3.0 km || 
|-id=416 bgcolor=#E9E9E9
| 288416 ||  || — || February 22, 2004 || Kitt Peak || Spacewatch || HOF || align=right | 3.2 km || 
|-id=417 bgcolor=#E9E9E9
| 288417 ||  || — || February 23, 2004 || Socorro || LINEAR || — || align=right data-sort-value="0.91" | 910 m || 
|-id=418 bgcolor=#d6d6d6
| 288418 ||  || — || February 26, 2004 || Socorro || LINEAR || — || align=right | 4.1 km || 
|-id=419 bgcolor=#E9E9E9
| 288419 ||  || — || February 29, 2004 || Kitt Peak || Spacewatch || — || align=right | 2.9 km || 
|-id=420 bgcolor=#fefefe
| 288420 ||  || — || February 17, 2004 || Kitt Peak || Spacewatch || V || align=right data-sort-value="0.72" | 720 m || 
|-id=421 bgcolor=#fefefe
| 288421 ||  || — || February 26, 2004 || Kitt Peak || M. W. Buie || MAS || align=right data-sort-value="0.48" | 480 m || 
|-id=422 bgcolor=#E9E9E9
| 288422 ||  || — || February 17, 2004 || Kitt Peak || Spacewatch || — || align=right | 1.0 km || 
|-id=423 bgcolor=#d6d6d6
| 288423 ||  || — || February 17, 2004 || Kitt Peak || Spacewatch || — || align=right | 2.8 km || 
|-id=424 bgcolor=#fefefe
| 288424 ||  || — || February 18, 2004 || Kitt Peak || Spacewatch || — || align=right | 1.2 km || 
|-id=425 bgcolor=#d6d6d6
| 288425 || 2004 EE || — || March 11, 2004 || Wrightwood || J. W. Young || — || align=right | 3.8 km || 
|-id=426 bgcolor=#fefefe
| 288426 ||  || — || March 13, 2004 || Palomar || NEAT || MAS || align=right data-sort-value="0.82" | 820 m || 
|-id=427 bgcolor=#d6d6d6
| 288427 ||  || — || March 11, 2004 || Palomar || NEAT || — || align=right | 2.9 km || 
|-id=428 bgcolor=#d6d6d6
| 288428 ||  || — || March 12, 2004 || Palomar || NEAT || — || align=right | 3.9 km || 
|-id=429 bgcolor=#d6d6d6
| 288429 ||  || — || March 14, 2004 || Kitt Peak || Spacewatch || EUP || align=right | 3.4 km || 
|-id=430 bgcolor=#fefefe
| 288430 ||  || — || March 15, 2004 || Valmeca || C. Demeautis, D. Matter || MAS || align=right data-sort-value="0.68" | 680 m || 
|-id=431 bgcolor=#fefefe
| 288431 ||  || — || March 15, 2004 || Socorro || LINEAR || NYS || align=right data-sort-value="0.71" | 710 m || 
|-id=432 bgcolor=#E9E9E9
| 288432 ||  || — || March 14, 2004 || Socorro || LINEAR || GAL || align=right | 2.3 km || 
|-id=433 bgcolor=#fefefe
| 288433 ||  || — || March 12, 2004 || Palomar || NEAT || H || align=right | 1.1 km || 
|-id=434 bgcolor=#d6d6d6
| 288434 ||  || — || March 13, 2004 || Palomar || NEAT || EMA || align=right | 4.7 km || 
|-id=435 bgcolor=#fefefe
| 288435 ||  || — || March 15, 2004 || Catalina || CSS || H || align=right data-sort-value="0.67" | 670 m || 
|-id=436 bgcolor=#d6d6d6
| 288436 ||  || — || March 15, 2004 || Palomar || NEAT || THB || align=right | 4.0 km || 
|-id=437 bgcolor=#d6d6d6
| 288437 ||  || — || March 15, 2004 || Palomar || NEAT || MEL || align=right | 5.7 km || 
|-id=438 bgcolor=#E9E9E9
| 288438 ||  || — || March 12, 2004 || Palomar || NEAT || GER || align=right | 1.9 km || 
|-id=439 bgcolor=#fefefe
| 288439 ||  || — || March 15, 2004 || Catalina || CSS || FLO || align=right data-sort-value="0.78" | 780 m || 
|-id=440 bgcolor=#d6d6d6
| 288440 ||  || — || March 15, 2004 || Palomar || NEAT || — || align=right | 3.1 km || 
|-id=441 bgcolor=#E9E9E9
| 288441 ||  || — || March 15, 2004 || Kitt Peak || Spacewatch || — || align=right | 2.1 km || 
|-id=442 bgcolor=#d6d6d6
| 288442 ||  || — || March 15, 2004 || Kitt Peak || Spacewatch || — || align=right | 2.5 km || 
|-id=443 bgcolor=#d6d6d6
| 288443 ||  || — || March 15, 2004 || Kitt Peak || Spacewatch || HIL3:2 || align=right | 6.7 km || 
|-id=444 bgcolor=#d6d6d6
| 288444 ||  || — || March 15, 2004 || Catalina || CSS || LIX || align=right | 4.0 km || 
|-id=445 bgcolor=#E9E9E9
| 288445 ||  || — || March 12, 2004 || Palomar || NEAT || NEM || align=right | 3.2 km || 
|-id=446 bgcolor=#E9E9E9
| 288446 ||  || — || March 14, 2004 || Palomar || NEAT || EUN || align=right | 1.7 km || 
|-id=447 bgcolor=#d6d6d6
| 288447 ||  || — || March 14, 2004 || Palomar || NEAT || — || align=right | 3.8 km || 
|-id=448 bgcolor=#E9E9E9
| 288448 ||  || — || March 14, 2004 || Palomar || NEAT || — || align=right | 3.8 km || 
|-id=449 bgcolor=#E9E9E9
| 288449 ||  || — || March 15, 2004 || Socorro || LINEAR || EUN || align=right | 1.5 km || 
|-id=450 bgcolor=#d6d6d6
| 288450 ||  || — || March 15, 2004 || Palomar || NEAT || — || align=right | 5.5 km || 
|-id=451 bgcolor=#E9E9E9
| 288451 ||  || — || March 12, 2004 || Palomar || NEAT || XIZ || align=right | 1.9 km || 
|-id=452 bgcolor=#fefefe
| 288452 ||  || — || March 12, 2004 || Palomar || NEAT || — || align=right data-sort-value="0.92" | 920 m || 
|-id=453 bgcolor=#fefefe
| 288453 ||  || — || March 15, 2004 || Kitt Peak || Spacewatch || NYS || align=right data-sort-value="0.77" | 770 m || 
|-id=454 bgcolor=#E9E9E9
| 288454 ||  || — || March 15, 2004 || Kitt Peak || Spacewatch || — || align=right | 1.4 km || 
|-id=455 bgcolor=#d6d6d6
| 288455 ||  || — || March 15, 2004 || Kitt Peak || Spacewatch || — || align=right | 3.4 km || 
|-id=456 bgcolor=#E9E9E9
| 288456 ||  || — || March 14, 2004 || Socorro || LINEAR || GEF || align=right | 1.9 km || 
|-id=457 bgcolor=#d6d6d6
| 288457 ||  || — || March 14, 2004 || Kitt Peak || Spacewatch || LIX || align=right | 5.0 km || 
|-id=458 bgcolor=#fefefe
| 288458 ||  || — || March 15, 2004 || Kitt Peak || Spacewatch || — || align=right | 1.0 km || 
|-id=459 bgcolor=#d6d6d6
| 288459 ||  || — || March 15, 2004 || Socorro || LINEAR || — || align=right | 2.3 km || 
|-id=460 bgcolor=#E9E9E9
| 288460 ||  || — || March 15, 2004 || Kitt Peak || Spacewatch || — || align=right | 1.9 km || 
|-id=461 bgcolor=#d6d6d6
| 288461 ||  || — || March 14, 2004 || Kitt Peak || Spacewatch || — || align=right | 3.6 km || 
|-id=462 bgcolor=#fefefe
| 288462 ||  || — || March 14, 2004 || Kitt Peak || Spacewatch || MAS || align=right data-sort-value="0.73" | 730 m || 
|-id=463 bgcolor=#d6d6d6
| 288463 ||  || — || March 15, 2004 || Kitt Peak || Spacewatch || — || align=right | 3.4 km || 
|-id=464 bgcolor=#fefefe
| 288464 ||  || — || March 15, 2004 || Kitt Peak || Spacewatch || MAS || align=right data-sort-value="0.78" | 780 m || 
|-id=465 bgcolor=#d6d6d6
| 288465 ||  || — || March 15, 2004 || Kitt Peak || Spacewatch || — || align=right | 3.4 km || 
|-id=466 bgcolor=#d6d6d6
| 288466 ||  || — || March 15, 2004 || Kitt Peak || Spacewatch || EOS || align=right | 2.7 km || 
|-id=467 bgcolor=#E9E9E9
| 288467 ||  || — || March 15, 2004 || Kitt Peak || Spacewatch || AST || align=right | 1.7 km || 
|-id=468 bgcolor=#E9E9E9
| 288468 ||  || — || March 15, 2004 || Socorro || LINEAR || — || align=right | 1.7 km || 
|-id=469 bgcolor=#d6d6d6
| 288469 ||  || — || March 15, 2004 || Kitt Peak || Spacewatch || — || align=right | 3.1 km || 
|-id=470 bgcolor=#fefefe
| 288470 ||  || — || March 16, 2004 || Socorro || LINEAR || H || align=right data-sort-value="0.65" | 650 m || 
|-id=471 bgcolor=#d6d6d6
| 288471 ||  || — || March 18, 2004 || Modra || J. Világi, L. Kornoš || Tj (2.98) || align=right | 4.0 km || 
|-id=472 bgcolor=#fefefe
| 288472 ||  || — || March 17, 2004 || Bergisch Gladbac || W. Bickel || — || align=right data-sort-value="0.77" | 770 m || 
|-id=473 bgcolor=#fefefe
| 288473 ||  || — || March 23, 2004 || Emerald Lane || L. Ball || — || align=right data-sort-value="0.98" | 980 m || 
|-id=474 bgcolor=#d6d6d6
| 288474 ||  || — || March 24, 2004 || Wrightwood || J. W. Young || KAR || align=right | 1.2 km || 
|-id=475 bgcolor=#d6d6d6
| 288475 ||  || — || March 16, 2004 || Socorro || LINEAR || — || align=right | 3.2 km || 
|-id=476 bgcolor=#E9E9E9
| 288476 ||  || — || March 16, 2004 || Kitt Peak || Spacewatch || KRM || align=right | 3.5 km || 
|-id=477 bgcolor=#d6d6d6
| 288477 ||  || — || March 16, 2004 || Siding Spring || SSS || — || align=right | 5.1 km || 
|-id=478 bgcolor=#E9E9E9
| 288478 Fahlman ||  ||  || March 16, 2004 || Mauna Kea || D. D. Balam || DOR || align=right | 2.7 km || 
|-id=479 bgcolor=#fefefe
| 288479 ||  || — || March 27, 2004 || Socorro || LINEAR || H || align=right data-sort-value="0.77" | 770 m || 
|-id=480 bgcolor=#E9E9E9
| 288480 ||  || — || March 16, 2004 || Socorro || LINEAR || MAR || align=right | 1.5 km || 
|-id=481 bgcolor=#E9E9E9
| 288481 ||  || — || March 16, 2004 || Siding Spring || SSS || EUN || align=right | 1.8 km || 
|-id=482 bgcolor=#fefefe
| 288482 ||  || — || March 16, 2004 || Campo Imperatore || CINEOS || SUL || align=right | 2.4 km || 
|-id=483 bgcolor=#E9E9E9
| 288483 ||  || — || March 17, 2004 || Kitt Peak || Spacewatch || NEM || align=right | 2.6 km || 
|-id=484 bgcolor=#E9E9E9
| 288484 ||  || — || March 17, 2004 || Kitt Peak || Spacewatch || — || align=right | 1.9 km || 
|-id=485 bgcolor=#fefefe
| 288485 ||  || — || March 17, 2004 || Kitt Peak || Spacewatch || — || align=right data-sort-value="0.63" | 630 m || 
|-id=486 bgcolor=#E9E9E9
| 288486 ||  || — || March 17, 2004 || Kitt Peak || Spacewatch || — || align=right | 1.8 km || 
|-id=487 bgcolor=#d6d6d6
| 288487 ||  || — || March 23, 2004 || Catalina || CSS || — || align=right | 3.9 km || 
|-id=488 bgcolor=#d6d6d6
| 288488 ||  || — || March 16, 2004 || Kitt Peak || Spacewatch || — || align=right | 4.9 km || 
|-id=489 bgcolor=#E9E9E9
| 288489 ||  || — || March 18, 2004 || Kitt Peak || Spacewatch || GEF || align=right | 1.6 km || 
|-id=490 bgcolor=#E9E9E9
| 288490 ||  || — || March 16, 2004 || Socorro || LINEAR || — || align=right | 3.2 km || 
|-id=491 bgcolor=#E9E9E9
| 288491 ||  || — || March 16, 2004 || Socorro || LINEAR || — || align=right | 1.7 km || 
|-id=492 bgcolor=#fefefe
| 288492 ||  || — || March 18, 2004 || Socorro || LINEAR || ERI || align=right | 1.8 km || 
|-id=493 bgcolor=#d6d6d6
| 288493 ||  || — || March 18, 2004 || Socorro || LINEAR || — || align=right | 5.7 km || 
|-id=494 bgcolor=#E9E9E9
| 288494 ||  || — || March 18, 2004 || Socorro || LINEAR || — || align=right | 2.9 km || 
|-id=495 bgcolor=#E9E9E9
| 288495 ||  || — || March 19, 2004 || Socorro || LINEAR || INO || align=right | 1.7 km || 
|-id=496 bgcolor=#fefefe
| 288496 ||  || — || March 18, 2004 || Socorro || LINEAR || NYS || align=right data-sort-value="0.62" | 620 m || 
|-id=497 bgcolor=#E9E9E9
| 288497 ||  || — || March 17, 2004 || Kitt Peak || Spacewatch || — || align=right | 2.2 km || 
|-id=498 bgcolor=#d6d6d6
| 288498 ||  || — || March 19, 2004 || Socorro || LINEAR || EUP || align=right | 4.1 km || 
|-id=499 bgcolor=#fefefe
| 288499 ||  || — || March 19, 2004 || Socorro || LINEAR || — || align=right | 1.1 km || 
|-id=500 bgcolor=#E9E9E9
| 288500 ||  || — || March 17, 2004 || Kitt Peak || Spacewatch || — || align=right | 1.8 km || 
|}

288501–288600 

|-bgcolor=#E9E9E9
| 288501 ||  || — || March 17, 2004 || Kitt Peak || Spacewatch || — || align=right | 1.7 km || 
|-id=502 bgcolor=#E9E9E9
| 288502 ||  || — || March 18, 2004 || Kitt Peak || Spacewatch || — || align=right | 1.3 km || 
|-id=503 bgcolor=#E9E9E9
| 288503 ||  || — || March 19, 2004 || Palomar || NEAT || — || align=right | 1.4 km || 
|-id=504 bgcolor=#fefefe
| 288504 ||  || — || March 17, 2004 || Palomar || NEAT || — || align=right | 1.3 km || 
|-id=505 bgcolor=#E9E9E9
| 288505 ||  || — || March 22, 2004 || Socorro || LINEAR || — || align=right | 2.7 km || 
|-id=506 bgcolor=#E9E9E9
| 288506 ||  || — || March 19, 2004 || Socorro || LINEAR || — || align=right | 4.0 km || 
|-id=507 bgcolor=#d6d6d6
| 288507 ||  || — || March 23, 2004 || Kitt Peak || Spacewatch || — || align=right | 3.0 km || 
|-id=508 bgcolor=#fefefe
| 288508 ||  || — || March 26, 2004 || Kitt Peak || Spacewatch || V || align=right data-sort-value="0.81" | 810 m || 
|-id=509 bgcolor=#E9E9E9
| 288509 ||  || — || March 18, 2004 || Socorro || LINEAR || — || align=right | 3.4 km || 
|-id=510 bgcolor=#E9E9E9
| 288510 ||  || — || March 20, 2004 || Socorro || LINEAR || — || align=right | 2.3 km || 
|-id=511 bgcolor=#E9E9E9
| 288511 ||  || — || March 23, 2004 || Kitt Peak || Spacewatch || HNA || align=right | 2.5 km || 
|-id=512 bgcolor=#E9E9E9
| 288512 ||  || — || March 26, 2004 || Kitt Peak || Spacewatch || INO || align=right | 1.1 km || 
|-id=513 bgcolor=#fefefe
| 288513 ||  || — || March 23, 2004 || Socorro || LINEAR || — || align=right data-sort-value="0.91" | 910 m || 
|-id=514 bgcolor=#E9E9E9
| 288514 ||  || — || March 22, 2004 || Socorro || LINEAR || — || align=right | 1.3 km || 
|-id=515 bgcolor=#d6d6d6
| 288515 ||  || — || March 23, 2004 || Socorro || LINEAR || EOS || align=right | 2.8 km || 
|-id=516 bgcolor=#d6d6d6
| 288516 ||  || — || March 26, 2004 || Socorro || LINEAR || TIR || align=right | 3.6 km || 
|-id=517 bgcolor=#E9E9E9
| 288517 ||  || — || March 26, 2004 || Catalina || CSS || — || align=right | 3.3 km || 
|-id=518 bgcolor=#E9E9E9
| 288518 ||  || — || March 28, 2004 || Socorro || LINEAR || — || align=right | 3.5 km || 
|-id=519 bgcolor=#fefefe
| 288519 ||  || — || March 29, 2004 || Kitt Peak || Spacewatch || — || align=right data-sort-value="0.69" | 690 m || 
|-id=520 bgcolor=#d6d6d6
| 288520 ||  || — || March 29, 2004 || Kitt Peak || Spacewatch || — || align=right | 3.2 km || 
|-id=521 bgcolor=#d6d6d6
| 288521 ||  || — || March 27, 2004 || Socorro || LINEAR || — || align=right | 3.4 km || 
|-id=522 bgcolor=#fefefe
| 288522 ||  || — || March 28, 2004 || Kitt Peak || Spacewatch || LCI || align=right | 1.3 km || 
|-id=523 bgcolor=#d6d6d6
| 288523 ||  || — || March 16, 2004 || Haleakala || NEAT || — || align=right | 3.8 km || 
|-id=524 bgcolor=#d6d6d6
| 288524 ||  || — || March 16, 2004 || Palomar || NEAT || — || align=right | 6.0 km || 
|-id=525 bgcolor=#d6d6d6
| 288525 ||  || — || March 17, 2004 || Kitt Peak || Spacewatch || — || align=right | 2.7 km || 
|-id=526 bgcolor=#E9E9E9
| 288526 ||  || — || March 29, 2004 || Catalina || CSS || BRU || align=right | 4.4 km || 
|-id=527 bgcolor=#fefefe
| 288527 ||  || — || March 17, 2004 || Palomar || NEAT || PHO || align=right | 1.5 km || 
|-id=528 bgcolor=#d6d6d6
| 288528 ||  || — || March 25, 2004 || Siding Spring || SSS || — || align=right | 4.6 km || 
|-id=529 bgcolor=#E9E9E9
| 288529 ||  || — || April 12, 2004 || Kitt Peak || Spacewatch || — || align=right | 2.3 km || 
|-id=530 bgcolor=#E9E9E9
| 288530 ||  || — || April 12, 2004 || Kitt Peak || Spacewatch || — || align=right | 1.6 km || 
|-id=531 bgcolor=#E9E9E9
| 288531 ||  || — || April 12, 2004 || Palomar || NEAT || — || align=right | 2.8 km || 
|-id=532 bgcolor=#d6d6d6
| 288532 ||  || — || April 12, 2004 || Kitt Peak || Spacewatch || — || align=right | 4.1 km || 
|-id=533 bgcolor=#E9E9E9
| 288533 ||  || — || April 13, 2004 || Mount Graham || W. H. Ryan, Q. Jamieson || — || align=right | 2.2 km || 
|-id=534 bgcolor=#d6d6d6
| 288534 ||  || — || April 9, 2004 || Siding Spring || SSS || TIR || align=right | 4.2 km || 
|-id=535 bgcolor=#d6d6d6
| 288535 ||  || — || April 12, 2004 || Siding Spring || SSS || — || align=right | 4.2 km || 
|-id=536 bgcolor=#E9E9E9
| 288536 ||  || — || April 15, 2004 || Socorro || LINEAR || — || align=right | 4.8 km || 
|-id=537 bgcolor=#E9E9E9
| 288537 ||  || — || April 10, 2004 || Palomar || NEAT || ADE || align=right | 2.7 km || 
|-id=538 bgcolor=#fefefe
| 288538 ||  || — || April 12, 2004 || Kitt Peak || Spacewatch || — || align=right data-sort-value="0.90" | 900 m || 
|-id=539 bgcolor=#fefefe
| 288539 ||  || — || April 13, 2004 || Catalina || CSS || — || align=right | 1.2 km || 
|-id=540 bgcolor=#E9E9E9
| 288540 ||  || — || April 13, 2004 || Catalina || CSS || RAF || align=right | 1.5 km || 
|-id=541 bgcolor=#fefefe
| 288541 ||  || — || April 14, 2004 || Kitt Peak || Spacewatch || — || align=right data-sort-value="0.78" | 780 m || 
|-id=542 bgcolor=#E9E9E9
| 288542 ||  || — || April 14, 2004 || Socorro || LINEAR || HNS || align=right | 1.6 km || 
|-id=543 bgcolor=#fefefe
| 288543 ||  || — || April 15, 2004 || Anderson Mesa || LONEOS || MAS || align=right data-sort-value="0.87" | 870 m || 
|-id=544 bgcolor=#fefefe
| 288544 ||  || — || April 11, 2004 || Palomar || NEAT || — || align=right | 1.2 km || 
|-id=545 bgcolor=#E9E9E9
| 288545 ||  || — || April 12, 2004 || Palomar || NEAT || PAE || align=right | 3.5 km || 
|-id=546 bgcolor=#d6d6d6
| 288546 ||  || — || April 13, 2004 || Palomar || NEAT || — || align=right | 4.7 km || 
|-id=547 bgcolor=#fefefe
| 288547 ||  || — || April 14, 2004 || Kitt Peak || Spacewatch || — || align=right data-sort-value="0.77" | 770 m || 
|-id=548 bgcolor=#fefefe
| 288548 ||  || — || April 12, 2004 || Kitt Peak || Spacewatch || MAS || align=right data-sort-value="0.81" | 810 m || 
|-id=549 bgcolor=#d6d6d6
| 288549 ||  || — || April 12, 2004 || Kitt Peak || Spacewatch || — || align=right | 2.9 km || 
|-id=550 bgcolor=#E9E9E9
| 288550 ||  || — || April 12, 2004 || Kitt Peak || Spacewatch || — || align=right | 1.8 km || 
|-id=551 bgcolor=#E9E9E9
| 288551 ||  || — || April 12, 2004 || Kitt Peak || Spacewatch || — || align=right | 1.4 km || 
|-id=552 bgcolor=#fefefe
| 288552 ||  || — || April 14, 2004 || Kitt Peak || Spacewatch || MAS || align=right data-sort-value="0.77" | 770 m || 
|-id=553 bgcolor=#d6d6d6
| 288553 ||  || — || April 13, 2004 || Kitt Peak || Spacewatch || THM || align=right | 2.6 km || 
|-id=554 bgcolor=#d6d6d6
| 288554 ||  || — || April 13, 2004 || Kitt Peak || Spacewatch || HYG || align=right | 2.8 km || 
|-id=555 bgcolor=#d6d6d6
| 288555 ||  || — || April 15, 2004 || Reedy Creek || J. Broughton || — || align=right | 2.3 km || 
|-id=556 bgcolor=#fefefe
| 288556 ||  || — || April 14, 2004 || Siding Spring || SSS || — || align=right | 1.2 km || 
|-id=557 bgcolor=#fefefe
| 288557 ||  || — || April 16, 2004 || Socorro || LINEAR || H || align=right | 1.1 km || 
|-id=558 bgcolor=#E9E9E9
| 288558 ||  || — || April 17, 2004 || Siding Spring || SSS || Tj (2.99) || align=right | 5.9 km || 
|-id=559 bgcolor=#d6d6d6
| 288559 ||  || — || April 16, 2004 || Palomar || NEAT || — || align=right | 3.4 km || 
|-id=560 bgcolor=#d6d6d6
| 288560 ||  || — || April 16, 2004 || Palomar || NEAT || HYG || align=right | 4.9 km || 
|-id=561 bgcolor=#fefefe
| 288561 ||  || — || April 16, 2004 || Socorro || LINEAR || — || align=right data-sort-value="0.93" | 930 m || 
|-id=562 bgcolor=#E9E9E9
| 288562 ||  || — || April 17, 2004 || Anderson Mesa || LONEOS || — || align=right | 2.2 km || 
|-id=563 bgcolor=#fefefe
| 288563 ||  || — || April 20, 2004 || Socorro || LINEAR || NYS || align=right data-sort-value="0.87" | 870 m || 
|-id=564 bgcolor=#fefefe
| 288564 ||  || — || April 17, 2004 || Socorro || LINEAR || V || align=right data-sort-value="0.90" | 900 m || 
|-id=565 bgcolor=#d6d6d6
| 288565 ||  || — || April 19, 2004 || Socorro || LINEAR || EUP || align=right | 6.8 km || 
|-id=566 bgcolor=#fefefe
| 288566 ||  || — || April 19, 2004 || Kitt Peak || Spacewatch || — || align=right data-sort-value="0.89" | 890 m || 
|-id=567 bgcolor=#d6d6d6
| 288567 ||  || — || April 19, 2004 || Socorro || LINEAR || — || align=right | 5.8 km || 
|-id=568 bgcolor=#E9E9E9
| 288568 ||  || — || April 20, 2004 || Kitt Peak || Spacewatch || — || align=right data-sort-value="0.94" | 940 m || 
|-id=569 bgcolor=#E9E9E9
| 288569 ||  || — || April 20, 2004 || Siding Spring || SSS || — || align=right | 1.8 km || 
|-id=570 bgcolor=#fefefe
| 288570 ||  || — || April 21, 2004 || Kitt Peak || Spacewatch || FLO || align=right data-sort-value="0.67" | 670 m || 
|-id=571 bgcolor=#d6d6d6
| 288571 ||  || — || April 21, 2004 || Kitt Peak || Spacewatch || MEL || align=right | 5.3 km || 
|-id=572 bgcolor=#d6d6d6
| 288572 ||  || — || April 19, 2004 || Kitt Peak || Spacewatch || — || align=right | 3.6 km || 
|-id=573 bgcolor=#d6d6d6
| 288573 ||  || — || April 19, 2004 || Kitt Peak || Spacewatch || — || align=right | 3.2 km || 
|-id=574 bgcolor=#E9E9E9
| 288574 ||  || — || April 21, 2004 || Socorro || LINEAR || — || align=right | 3.6 km || 
|-id=575 bgcolor=#fefefe
| 288575 ||  || — || April 23, 2004 || Kitt Peak || Spacewatch || — || align=right | 1.0 km || 
|-id=576 bgcolor=#E9E9E9
| 288576 ||  || — || April 24, 2004 || Kitt Peak || Spacewatch || — || align=right | 1.4 km || 
|-id=577 bgcolor=#d6d6d6
| 288577 ||  || — || April 24, 2004 || Kitt Peak || Spacewatch || — || align=right | 2.7 km || 
|-id=578 bgcolor=#fefefe
| 288578 ||  || — || April 25, 2004 || Catalina || CSS || — || align=right | 1.1 km || 
|-id=579 bgcolor=#fefefe
| 288579 ||  || — || April 24, 2004 || Catalina || CSS || H || align=right | 1.0 km || 
|-id=580 bgcolor=#E9E9E9
| 288580 ||  || — || April 16, 2004 || Siding Spring || SSS || EUN || align=right | 1.9 km || 
|-id=581 bgcolor=#E9E9E9
| 288581 ||  || — || April 19, 2004 || Kitt Peak || Spacewatch || — || align=right | 1.9 km || 
|-id=582 bgcolor=#d6d6d6
| 288582 ||  || — || May 9, 2004 || Kitt Peak || Spacewatch || — || align=right | 2.5 km || 
|-id=583 bgcolor=#E9E9E9
| 288583 ||  || — || May 9, 2004 || Kitt Peak || Spacewatch || — || align=right | 1.9 km || 
|-id=584 bgcolor=#d6d6d6
| 288584 ||  || — || May 10, 2004 || Reedy Creek || J. Broughton || — || align=right | 3.9 km || 
|-id=585 bgcolor=#d6d6d6
| 288585 ||  || — || May 11, 2004 || Siding Spring || SSS || LUT || align=right | 6.5 km || 
|-id=586 bgcolor=#E9E9E9
| 288586 ||  || — || May 13, 2004 || Socorro || LINEAR || — || align=right | 1.7 km || 
|-id=587 bgcolor=#fefefe
| 288587 ||  || — || May 9, 2004 || Kitt Peak || Spacewatch || — || align=right | 1.3 km || 
|-id=588 bgcolor=#d6d6d6
| 288588 ||  || — || May 11, 2004 || Anderson Mesa || LONEOS || TIR || align=right | 3.9 km || 
|-id=589 bgcolor=#fefefe
| 288589 ||  || — || May 11, 2004 || Anderson Mesa || LONEOS || NYS || align=right data-sort-value="0.74" | 740 m || 
|-id=590 bgcolor=#d6d6d6
| 288590 ||  || — || May 12, 2004 || Catalina || CSS || — || align=right | 4.3 km || 
|-id=591 bgcolor=#fefefe
| 288591 ||  || — || May 13, 2004 || Kitt Peak || Spacewatch || NYS || align=right data-sort-value="0.81" | 810 m || 
|-id=592 bgcolor=#FFC2E0
| 288592 ||  || — || May 15, 2004 || Socorro || LINEAR || ATE || align=right data-sort-value="0.25" | 250 m || 
|-id=593 bgcolor=#d6d6d6
| 288593 ||  || — || May 9, 2004 || Kitt Peak || Spacewatch || — || align=right | 3.7 km || 
|-id=594 bgcolor=#d6d6d6
| 288594 ||  || — || May 15, 2004 || Socorro || LINEAR || — || align=right | 3.0 km || 
|-id=595 bgcolor=#d6d6d6
| 288595 ||  || — || May 15, 2004 || Socorro || LINEAR || — || align=right | 4.8 km || 
|-id=596 bgcolor=#E9E9E9
| 288596 ||  || — || May 15, 2004 || Socorro || LINEAR || MIS || align=right | 3.4 km || 
|-id=597 bgcolor=#fefefe
| 288597 ||  || — || May 15, 2004 || Socorro || LINEAR || — || align=right data-sort-value="0.75" | 750 m || 
|-id=598 bgcolor=#E9E9E9
| 288598 ||  || — || May 13, 2004 || Kitt Peak || Spacewatch || AST || align=right | 1.8 km || 
|-id=599 bgcolor=#E9E9E9
| 288599 ||  || — || May 15, 2004 || Socorro || LINEAR || — || align=right | 1.3 km || 
|-id=600 bgcolor=#d6d6d6
| 288600 ||  || — || May 16, 2004 || Socorro || LINEAR || — || align=right | 5.2 km || 
|}

288601–288700 

|-bgcolor=#d6d6d6
| 288601 ||  || — || May 18, 2004 || Socorro || LINEAR || HYG || align=right | 4.4 km || 
|-id=602 bgcolor=#E9E9E9
| 288602 ||  || — || May 18, 2004 || Socorro || LINEAR || — || align=right | 1.5 km || 
|-id=603 bgcolor=#E9E9E9
| 288603 ||  || — || May 23, 2004 || Kitt Peak || Spacewatch || ADE || align=right | 2.6 km || 
|-id=604 bgcolor=#E9E9E9
| 288604 ||  || — || June 12, 2004 || Catalina || CSS || — || align=right | 3.3 km || 
|-id=605 bgcolor=#fefefe
| 288605 ||  || — || June 13, 2004 || Palomar || NEAT || — || align=right | 1.1 km || 
|-id=606 bgcolor=#E9E9E9
| 288606 ||  || — || June 11, 2004 || Kitt Peak || Spacewatch || — || align=right | 1.7 km || 
|-id=607 bgcolor=#fefefe
| 288607 ||  || — || June 15, 2004 || Socorro || LINEAR || — || align=right | 1.2 km || 
|-id=608 bgcolor=#fefefe
| 288608 ||  || — || June 15, 2004 || Socorro || LINEAR || — || align=right | 1.0 km || 
|-id=609 bgcolor=#E9E9E9
| 288609 ||  || — || June 12, 2004 || Socorro || LINEAR || — || align=right | 1.9 km || 
|-id=610 bgcolor=#d6d6d6
| 288610 ||  || — || June 15, 2004 || Kitt Peak || Spacewatch || — || align=right | 3.7 km || 
|-id=611 bgcolor=#E9E9E9
| 288611 ||  || — || June 29, 2004 || Siding Spring || SSS || EUN || align=right | 1.8 km || 
|-id=612 bgcolor=#E9E9E9
| 288612 ||  || — || July 9, 2004 || Socorro || LINEAR || — || align=right | 3.2 km || 
|-id=613 bgcolor=#E9E9E9
| 288613 ||  || — || July 11, 2004 || Socorro || LINEAR || JUN || align=right | 1.9 km || 
|-id=614 bgcolor=#d6d6d6
| 288614 ||  || — || July 11, 2004 || Socorro || LINEAR || INA || align=right | 3.3 km || 
|-id=615 bgcolor=#E9E9E9
| 288615 Tempesti ||  ||  || July 11, 2004 || Vallemare di Borbona || V. S. Casulli || — || align=right | 2.0 km || 
|-id=616 bgcolor=#d6d6d6
| 288616 ||  || — || July 9, 2004 || Socorro || LINEAR || MEL || align=right | 5.9 km || 
|-id=617 bgcolor=#fefefe
| 288617 ||  || — || July 11, 2004 || Socorro || LINEAR || FLO || align=right data-sort-value="0.82" | 820 m || 
|-id=618 bgcolor=#fefefe
| 288618 ||  || — || July 11, 2004 || Socorro || LINEAR || NYS || align=right data-sort-value="0.79" | 790 m || 
|-id=619 bgcolor=#fefefe
| 288619 ||  || — || July 11, 2004 || Socorro || LINEAR || PHO || align=right | 1.5 km || 
|-id=620 bgcolor=#E9E9E9
| 288620 ||  || — || July 11, 2004 || Socorro || LINEAR || — || align=right | 1.4 km || 
|-id=621 bgcolor=#E9E9E9
| 288621 ||  || — || July 14, 2004 || Socorro || LINEAR || EUN || align=right | 2.1 km || 
|-id=622 bgcolor=#fefefe
| 288622 ||  || — || July 14, 2004 || Socorro || LINEAR || — || align=right | 1.1 km || 
|-id=623 bgcolor=#d6d6d6
| 288623 ||  || — || July 19, 2004 || Anderson Mesa || LONEOS || — || align=right | 2.8 km || 
|-id=624 bgcolor=#E9E9E9
| 288624 ||  || — || July 20, 2004 || Reedy Creek || J. Broughton || — || align=right | 1.4 km || 
|-id=625 bgcolor=#d6d6d6
| 288625 ||  || — || July 21, 2004 || Siding Spring || SSS || — || align=right | 4.3 km || 
|-id=626 bgcolor=#fefefe
| 288626 ||  || — || August 5, 2004 || Palomar || NEAT || — || align=right | 1.1 km || 
|-id=627 bgcolor=#d6d6d6
| 288627 ||  || — || August 6, 2004 || Palomar || NEAT || EUP || align=right | 3.7 km || 
|-id=628 bgcolor=#fefefe
| 288628 ||  || — || August 6, 2004 || Palomar || NEAT || V || align=right data-sort-value="0.90" | 900 m || 
|-id=629 bgcolor=#fefefe
| 288629 ||  || — || August 6, 2004 || Palomar || NEAT || — || align=right data-sort-value="0.89" | 890 m || 
|-id=630 bgcolor=#E9E9E9
| 288630 ||  || — || August 7, 2004 || Palomar || NEAT || AGN || align=right | 1.6 km || 
|-id=631 bgcolor=#fefefe
| 288631 ||  || — || August 7, 2004 || Palomar || NEAT || — || align=right data-sort-value="0.82" | 820 m || 
|-id=632 bgcolor=#fefefe
| 288632 ||  || — || August 7, 2004 || Palomar || NEAT || — || align=right data-sort-value="0.92" | 920 m || 
|-id=633 bgcolor=#fefefe
| 288633 ||  || — || August 8, 2004 || Palomar || NEAT || FLO || align=right data-sort-value="0.85" | 850 m || 
|-id=634 bgcolor=#fefefe
| 288634 ||  || — || August 8, 2004 || Socorro || LINEAR || — || align=right data-sort-value="0.89" | 890 m || 
|-id=635 bgcolor=#fefefe
| 288635 ||  || — || August 8, 2004 || Socorro || LINEAR || — || align=right | 1.5 km || 
|-id=636 bgcolor=#E9E9E9
| 288636 ||  || — || August 9, 2004 || Reedy Creek || J. Broughton || ADE || align=right | 3.5 km || 
|-id=637 bgcolor=#fefefe
| 288637 ||  || — || August 7, 2004 || Palomar || NEAT || FLO || align=right data-sort-value="0.91" | 910 m || 
|-id=638 bgcolor=#FA8072
| 288638 ||  || — || August 8, 2004 || Socorro || LINEAR || — || align=right data-sort-value="0.98" | 980 m || 
|-id=639 bgcolor=#E9E9E9
| 288639 ||  || — || August 8, 2004 || Socorro || LINEAR || GER || align=right | 3.8 km || 
|-id=640 bgcolor=#fefefe
| 288640 ||  || — || August 8, 2004 || Socorro || LINEAR || — || align=right | 1.2 km || 
|-id=641 bgcolor=#fefefe
| 288641 ||  || — || August 9, 2004 || Campo Imperatore || CINEOS || MAS || align=right data-sort-value="0.83" | 830 m || 
|-id=642 bgcolor=#E9E9E9
| 288642 ||  || — || August 9, 2004 || Socorro || LINEAR || — || align=right | 1.5 km || 
|-id=643 bgcolor=#E9E9E9
| 288643 ||  || — || August 9, 2004 || Socorro || LINEAR || — || align=right | 3.5 km || 
|-id=644 bgcolor=#fefefe
| 288644 ||  || — || August 9, 2004 || Socorro || LINEAR || — || align=right | 1.0 km || 
|-id=645 bgcolor=#E9E9E9
| 288645 ||  || — || August 9, 2004 || Socorro || LINEAR || — || align=right | 2.2 km || 
|-id=646 bgcolor=#E9E9E9
| 288646 ||  || — || August 9, 2004 || Reedy Creek || J. Broughton || — || align=right | 1.8 km || 
|-id=647 bgcolor=#d6d6d6
| 288647 ||  || — || August 6, 2004 || Palomar || NEAT || EOS || align=right | 2.2 km || 
|-id=648 bgcolor=#E9E9E9
| 288648 ||  || — || August 6, 2004 || Campo Imperatore || CINEOS || — || align=right | 2.6 km || 
|-id=649 bgcolor=#d6d6d6
| 288649 ||  || — || August 7, 2004 || Palomar || NEAT || — || align=right | 4.9 km || 
|-id=650 bgcolor=#fefefe
| 288650 ||  || — || August 8, 2004 || Campo Imperatore || CINEOS || NYS || align=right data-sort-value="0.63" | 630 m || 
|-id=651 bgcolor=#fefefe
| 288651 ||  || — || August 8, 2004 || Palomar || NEAT || — || align=right data-sort-value="0.73" | 730 m || 
|-id=652 bgcolor=#fefefe
| 288652 ||  || — || August 8, 2004 || Socorro || LINEAR || — || align=right | 1.0 km || 
|-id=653 bgcolor=#fefefe
| 288653 ||  || — || August 8, 2004 || Socorro || LINEAR || — || align=right data-sort-value="0.92" | 920 m || 
|-id=654 bgcolor=#d6d6d6
| 288654 ||  || — || August 8, 2004 || Socorro || LINEAR || — || align=right | 2.9 km || 
|-id=655 bgcolor=#fefefe
| 288655 ||  || — || August 8, 2004 || Socorro || LINEAR || — || align=right | 1.2 km || 
|-id=656 bgcolor=#fefefe
| 288656 ||  || — || August 8, 2004 || Anderson Mesa || LONEOS || V || align=right data-sort-value="0.86" | 860 m || 
|-id=657 bgcolor=#fefefe
| 288657 ||  || — || August 8, 2004 || Anderson Mesa || LONEOS || — || align=right data-sort-value="0.94" | 940 m || 
|-id=658 bgcolor=#fefefe
| 288658 ||  || — || August 9, 2004 || Campo Imperatore || CINEOS || — || align=right data-sort-value="0.83" | 830 m || 
|-id=659 bgcolor=#fefefe
| 288659 ||  || — || August 9, 2004 || Anderson Mesa || LONEOS || FLO || align=right data-sort-value="0.76" | 760 m || 
|-id=660 bgcolor=#fefefe
| 288660 ||  || — || August 9, 2004 || Socorro || LINEAR || V || align=right data-sort-value="0.94" | 940 m || 
|-id=661 bgcolor=#d6d6d6
| 288661 ||  || — || August 9, 2004 || Socorro || LINEAR || — || align=right | 2.7 km || 
|-id=662 bgcolor=#d6d6d6
| 288662 ||  || — || August 9, 2004 || Socorro || LINEAR || — || align=right | 4.1 km || 
|-id=663 bgcolor=#E9E9E9
| 288663 ||  || — || August 9, 2004 || Socorro || LINEAR || — || align=right | 2.2 km || 
|-id=664 bgcolor=#d6d6d6
| 288664 ||  || — || August 9, 2004 || Socorro || LINEAR || BRA || align=right | 1.8 km || 
|-id=665 bgcolor=#fefefe
| 288665 ||  || — || August 10, 2004 || Campo Imperatore || CINEOS || — || align=right data-sort-value="0.83" | 830 m || 
|-id=666 bgcolor=#d6d6d6
| 288666 ||  || — || August 10, 2004 || Socorro || LINEAR || — || align=right | 5.1 km || 
|-id=667 bgcolor=#fefefe
| 288667 ||  || — || August 10, 2004 || Anderson Mesa || LONEOS || V || align=right data-sort-value="0.68" | 680 m || 
|-id=668 bgcolor=#fefefe
| 288668 ||  || — || August 5, 2004 || Palomar || NEAT || — || align=right data-sort-value="0.97" | 970 m || 
|-id=669 bgcolor=#fefefe
| 288669 ||  || — || August 6, 2004 || Palomar || NEAT || FLO || align=right data-sort-value="0.81" | 810 m || 
|-id=670 bgcolor=#E9E9E9
| 288670 ||  || — || August 7, 2004 || Palomar || NEAT || — || align=right | 2.5 km || 
|-id=671 bgcolor=#E9E9E9
| 288671 ||  || — || August 8, 2004 || Palomar || NEAT || — || align=right | 2.1 km || 
|-id=672 bgcolor=#fefefe
| 288672 ||  || — || August 8, 2004 || Palomar || NEAT || — || align=right | 1.1 km || 
|-id=673 bgcolor=#d6d6d6
| 288673 ||  || — || August 8, 2004 || Socorro || LINEAR || THM || align=right | 2.4 km || 
|-id=674 bgcolor=#fefefe
| 288674 ||  || — || August 9, 2004 || Socorro || LINEAR || V || align=right data-sort-value="0.64" | 640 m || 
|-id=675 bgcolor=#fefefe
| 288675 ||  || — || August 9, 2004 || Socorro || LINEAR || — || align=right | 1.0 km || 
|-id=676 bgcolor=#fefefe
| 288676 ||  || — || August 9, 2004 || Anderson Mesa || LONEOS || — || align=right data-sort-value="0.67" | 670 m || 
|-id=677 bgcolor=#d6d6d6
| 288677 ||  || — || August 10, 2004 || Socorro || LINEAR || EOS || align=right | 2.3 km || 
|-id=678 bgcolor=#E9E9E9
| 288678 ||  || — || August 10, 2004 || Socorro || LINEAR || GEF || align=right | 2.0 km || 
|-id=679 bgcolor=#fefefe
| 288679 ||  || — || August 11, 2004 || Socorro || LINEAR || V || align=right data-sort-value="0.78" | 780 m || 
|-id=680 bgcolor=#fefefe
| 288680 ||  || — || August 12, 2004 || Socorro || LINEAR || V || align=right | 1.0 km || 
|-id=681 bgcolor=#fefefe
| 288681 ||  || — || August 9, 2004 || Socorro || LINEAR || KLI || align=right | 3.3 km || 
|-id=682 bgcolor=#fefefe
| 288682 ||  || — || August 8, 2004 || Anderson Mesa || LONEOS || — || align=right | 1.0 km || 
|-id=683 bgcolor=#fefefe
| 288683 ||  || — || August 11, 2004 || Socorro || LINEAR || — || align=right data-sort-value="0.80" | 800 m || 
|-id=684 bgcolor=#d6d6d6
| 288684 ||  || — || August 14, 2004 || Reedy Creek || J. Broughton || — || align=right | 3.5 km || 
|-id=685 bgcolor=#fefefe
| 288685 ||  || — || August 8, 2004 || Socorro || LINEAR || — || align=right | 1.0 km || 
|-id=686 bgcolor=#d6d6d6
| 288686 ||  || — || August 10, 2004 || Socorro || LINEAR || TRE || align=right | 3.4 km || 
|-id=687 bgcolor=#d6d6d6
| 288687 ||  || — || August 12, 2004 || Socorro || LINEAR || — || align=right | 3.9 km || 
|-id=688 bgcolor=#d6d6d6
| 288688 ||  || — || August 12, 2004 || Socorro || LINEAR || THB || align=right | 3.9 km || 
|-id=689 bgcolor=#d6d6d6
| 288689 ||  || — || August 15, 2004 || Palomar || NEAT || LIX || align=right | 5.6 km || 
|-id=690 bgcolor=#E9E9E9
| 288690 ||  || — || August 12, 2004 || Socorro || LINEAR || INO || align=right | 1.9 km || 
|-id=691 bgcolor=#fefefe
| 288691 ||  || — || August 16, 2004 || Wrightwood || J. W. Young || — || align=right data-sort-value="0.80" | 800 m || 
|-id=692 bgcolor=#fefefe
| 288692 ||  || — || August 19, 2004 || Pla D'Arguines || R. Ferrando || H || align=right data-sort-value="0.83" | 830 m || 
|-id=693 bgcolor=#E9E9E9
| 288693 ||  || — || August 19, 2004 || Socorro || LINEAR || — || align=right | 3.0 km || 
|-id=694 bgcolor=#E9E9E9
| 288694 ||  || — || August 20, 2004 || Siding Spring || SSS || — || align=right | 3.1 km || 
|-id=695 bgcolor=#d6d6d6
| 288695 ||  || — || August 21, 2004 || Siding Spring || SSS || — || align=right | 4.6 km || 
|-id=696 bgcolor=#fefefe
| 288696 ||  || — || August 23, 2004 || Goodricke-Pigott || Goodricke-Pigott Obs. || FLO || align=right data-sort-value="0.79" | 790 m || 
|-id=697 bgcolor=#fefefe
| 288697 ||  || — || August 25, 2004 || Socorro || LINEAR || PHO || align=right data-sort-value="0.90" | 900 m || 
|-id=698 bgcolor=#fefefe
| 288698 ||  || — || August 11, 2004 || Socorro || LINEAR || NYS || align=right data-sort-value="0.70" | 700 m || 
|-id=699 bgcolor=#fefefe
| 288699 ||  || — || August 22, 2004 || Goodricke-Pigott || Goodricke-Pigott Obs. || FLO || align=right data-sort-value="0.85" | 850 m || 
|-id=700 bgcolor=#E9E9E9
| 288700 ||  || — || August 20, 2004 || Kitt Peak || Spacewatch || NEM || align=right | 2.3 km || 
|}

288701–288800 

|-bgcolor=#E9E9E9
| 288701 ||  || — || August 26, 2004 || Socorro || LINEAR || TIN || align=right | 3.5 km || 
|-id=702 bgcolor=#d6d6d6
| 288702 ||  || — || August 20, 2004 || Catalina || CSS || TIR || align=right | 3.5 km || 
|-id=703 bgcolor=#fefefe
| 288703 ||  || — || September 2, 2004 || Wrightwood || J. W. Young || NYS || align=right data-sort-value="0.74" | 740 m || 
|-id=704 bgcolor=#d6d6d6
| 288704 ||  || — || September 4, 2004 || Palomar || NEAT || — || align=right | 3.7 km || 
|-id=705 bgcolor=#d6d6d6
| 288705 ||  || — || September 4, 2004 || Palomar || NEAT || — || align=right | 4.4 km || 
|-id=706 bgcolor=#fefefe
| 288706 ||  || — || September 4, 2004 || Palomar || NEAT || — || align=right | 1.0 km || 
|-id=707 bgcolor=#d6d6d6
| 288707 ||  || — || September 5, 2004 || Palomar || NEAT || — || align=right | 4.0 km || 
|-id=708 bgcolor=#d6d6d6
| 288708 ||  || — || September 5, 2004 || Palomar || NEAT || TRP || align=right | 3.7 km || 
|-id=709 bgcolor=#d6d6d6
| 288709 ||  || — || September 5, 2004 || Palomar || NEAT || — || align=right | 3.7 km || 
|-id=710 bgcolor=#E9E9E9
| 288710 ||  || — || September 6, 2004 || Palomar || NEAT || JUN || align=right | 3.1 km || 
|-id=711 bgcolor=#fefefe
| 288711 ||  || — || September 8, 2004 || Saint-Véran || Saint-Véran Obs. || ERI || align=right | 1.8 km || 
|-id=712 bgcolor=#fefefe
| 288712 ||  || — || September 7, 2004 || Kitt Peak || Spacewatch || — || align=right | 1.1 km || 
|-id=713 bgcolor=#E9E9E9
| 288713 ||  || — || September 7, 2004 || Socorro || LINEAR || — || align=right | 3.2 km || 
|-id=714 bgcolor=#fefefe
| 288714 ||  || — || September 7, 2004 || Socorro || LINEAR || FLO || align=right data-sort-value="0.87" | 870 m || 
|-id=715 bgcolor=#fefefe
| 288715 ||  || — || September 7, 2004 || Socorro || LINEAR || — || align=right data-sort-value="0.92" | 920 m || 
|-id=716 bgcolor=#fefefe
| 288716 ||  || — || September 7, 2004 || Socorro || LINEAR || — || align=right data-sort-value="0.98" | 980 m || 
|-id=717 bgcolor=#fefefe
| 288717 ||  || — || September 7, 2004 || Kitt Peak || Spacewatch || NYS || align=right data-sort-value="0.77" | 770 m || 
|-id=718 bgcolor=#E9E9E9
| 288718 ||  || — || September 7, 2004 || Kitt Peak || Spacewatch || — || align=right | 1.2 km || 
|-id=719 bgcolor=#E9E9E9
| 288719 ||  || — || September 6, 2004 || Siding Spring || SSS || — || align=right | 1.5 km || 
|-id=720 bgcolor=#fefefe
| 288720 ||  || — || September 7, 2004 || Socorro || LINEAR || FLO || align=right data-sort-value="0.76" | 760 m || 
|-id=721 bgcolor=#E9E9E9
| 288721 ||  || — || September 7, 2004 || Socorro || LINEAR || DOR || align=right | 3.3 km || 
|-id=722 bgcolor=#E9E9E9
| 288722 ||  || — || September 7, 2004 || Socorro || LINEAR || ADE || align=right | 2.0 km || 
|-id=723 bgcolor=#fefefe
| 288723 ||  || — || September 7, 2004 || Socorro || LINEAR || — || align=right | 1.2 km || 
|-id=724 bgcolor=#d6d6d6
| 288724 ||  || — || September 8, 2004 || Campo Imperatore || CINEOS || — || align=right | 3.9 km || 
|-id=725 bgcolor=#d6d6d6
| 288725 ||  || — || September 8, 2004 || Socorro || LINEAR || — || align=right | 3.2 km || 
|-id=726 bgcolor=#E9E9E9
| 288726 ||  || — || September 8, 2004 || Socorro || LINEAR || — || align=right | 1.4 km || 
|-id=727 bgcolor=#d6d6d6
| 288727 ||  || — || September 8, 2004 || Socorro || LINEAR || — || align=right | 3.6 km || 
|-id=728 bgcolor=#fefefe
| 288728 ||  || — || September 8, 2004 || Socorro || LINEAR || — || align=right data-sort-value="0.74" | 740 m || 
|-id=729 bgcolor=#d6d6d6
| 288729 ||  || — || September 8, 2004 || Socorro || LINEAR || EOS || align=right | 2.5 km || 
|-id=730 bgcolor=#fefefe
| 288730 ||  || — || September 8, 2004 || Socorro || LINEAR || MAS || align=right data-sort-value="0.87" | 870 m || 
|-id=731 bgcolor=#d6d6d6
| 288731 ||  || — || September 8, 2004 || Socorro || LINEAR || EOS || align=right | 3.1 km || 
|-id=732 bgcolor=#d6d6d6
| 288732 ||  || — || September 8, 2004 || Socorro || LINEAR || KAR || align=right | 1.5 km || 
|-id=733 bgcolor=#d6d6d6
| 288733 ||  || — || September 8, 2004 || Socorro || LINEAR || — || align=right | 3.2 km || 
|-id=734 bgcolor=#d6d6d6
| 288734 ||  || — || September 8, 2004 || Socorro || LINEAR || HYG || align=right | 3.8 km || 
|-id=735 bgcolor=#fefefe
| 288735 ||  || — || September 8, 2004 || Socorro || LINEAR || — || align=right data-sort-value="0.94" | 940 m || 
|-id=736 bgcolor=#d6d6d6
| 288736 ||  || — || September 8, 2004 || Socorro || LINEAR || HYG || align=right | 3.1 km || 
|-id=737 bgcolor=#fefefe
| 288737 ||  || — || September 8, 2004 || Socorro || LINEAR || — || align=right data-sort-value="0.96" | 960 m || 
|-id=738 bgcolor=#fefefe
| 288738 ||  || — || September 8, 2004 || Socorro || LINEAR || — || align=right data-sort-value="0.93" | 930 m || 
|-id=739 bgcolor=#d6d6d6
| 288739 ||  || — || September 8, 2004 || Socorro || LINEAR || — || align=right | 3.3 km || 
|-id=740 bgcolor=#E9E9E9
| 288740 ||  || — || September 8, 2004 || Socorro || LINEAR || MAR || align=right | 1.4 km || 
|-id=741 bgcolor=#d6d6d6
| 288741 ||  || — || September 8, 2004 || Socorro || LINEAR || — || align=right | 3.9 km || 
|-id=742 bgcolor=#fefefe
| 288742 ||  || — || September 8, 2004 || Socorro || LINEAR || FLO || align=right data-sort-value="0.74" | 740 m || 
|-id=743 bgcolor=#fefefe
| 288743 ||  || — || September 8, 2004 || Socorro || LINEAR || — || align=right | 1.1 km || 
|-id=744 bgcolor=#fefefe
| 288744 ||  || — || September 8, 2004 || Socorro || LINEAR || — || align=right | 1.2 km || 
|-id=745 bgcolor=#fefefe
| 288745 ||  || — || September 8, 2004 || Socorro || LINEAR || — || align=right | 1.1 km || 
|-id=746 bgcolor=#fefefe
| 288746 ||  || — || September 8, 2004 || Socorro || LINEAR || — || align=right | 1.0 km || 
|-id=747 bgcolor=#fefefe
| 288747 ||  || — || September 8, 2004 || Socorro || LINEAR || NYS || align=right data-sort-value="0.68" | 680 m || 
|-id=748 bgcolor=#fefefe
| 288748 ||  || — || September 8, 2004 || Socorro || LINEAR || — || align=right data-sort-value="0.91" | 910 m || 
|-id=749 bgcolor=#fefefe
| 288749 ||  || — || September 8, 2004 || Socorro || LINEAR || NYS || align=right data-sort-value="0.78" | 780 m || 
|-id=750 bgcolor=#fefefe
| 288750 ||  || — || September 8, 2004 || Socorro || LINEAR || V || align=right data-sort-value="0.87" | 870 m || 
|-id=751 bgcolor=#d6d6d6
| 288751 ||  || — || September 8, 2004 || Socorro || LINEAR || — || align=right | 2.8 km || 
|-id=752 bgcolor=#fefefe
| 288752 ||  || — || September 8, 2004 || Socorro || LINEAR || V || align=right data-sort-value="0.89" | 890 m || 
|-id=753 bgcolor=#d6d6d6
| 288753 ||  || — || September 8, 2004 || Socorro || LINEAR || — || align=right | 3.5 km || 
|-id=754 bgcolor=#fefefe
| 288754 ||  || — || September 8, 2004 || Socorro || LINEAR || V || align=right data-sort-value="0.78" | 780 m || 
|-id=755 bgcolor=#fefefe
| 288755 ||  || — || September 8, 2004 || Socorro || LINEAR || FLO || align=right data-sort-value="0.84" | 840 m || 
|-id=756 bgcolor=#fefefe
| 288756 ||  || — || September 8, 2004 || Socorro || LINEAR || — || align=right data-sort-value="0.91" | 910 m || 
|-id=757 bgcolor=#E9E9E9
| 288757 ||  || — || September 7, 2004 || Socorro || LINEAR || — || align=right | 1.0 km || 
|-id=758 bgcolor=#E9E9E9
| 288758 ||  || — || September 8, 2004 || Socorro || LINEAR || — || align=right | 1.9 km || 
|-id=759 bgcolor=#d6d6d6
| 288759 ||  || — || September 8, 2004 || Socorro || LINEAR || 7:4 || align=right | 5.3 km || 
|-id=760 bgcolor=#d6d6d6
| 288760 ||  || — || September 8, 2004 || Socorro || LINEAR || — || align=right | 4.0 km || 
|-id=761 bgcolor=#fefefe
| 288761 ||  || — || September 9, 2004 || Socorro || LINEAR || MAS || align=right data-sort-value="0.86" | 860 m || 
|-id=762 bgcolor=#fefefe
| 288762 ||  || — || September 8, 2004 || Socorro || LINEAR || — || align=right data-sort-value="0.91" | 910 m || 
|-id=763 bgcolor=#d6d6d6
| 288763 ||  || — || September 8, 2004 || Socorro || LINEAR || EOS || align=right | 2.4 km || 
|-id=764 bgcolor=#d6d6d6
| 288764 ||  || — || September 8, 2004 || Socorro || LINEAR || — || align=right | 3.2 km || 
|-id=765 bgcolor=#fefefe
| 288765 ||  || — || September 8, 2004 || Socorro || LINEAR || FLO || align=right data-sort-value="0.72" | 720 m || 
|-id=766 bgcolor=#E9E9E9
| 288766 ||  || — || September 8, 2004 || Socorro || LINEAR || — || align=right | 2.6 km || 
|-id=767 bgcolor=#fefefe
| 288767 ||  || — || September 8, 2004 || Socorro || LINEAR || V || align=right data-sort-value="0.89" | 890 m || 
|-id=768 bgcolor=#FA8072
| 288768 ||  || — || September 8, 2004 || Socorro || LINEAR || — || align=right | 1.2 km || 
|-id=769 bgcolor=#E9E9E9
| 288769 ||  || — || September 8, 2004 || Socorro || LINEAR || — || align=right | 4.2 km || 
|-id=770 bgcolor=#fefefe
| 288770 ||  || — || September 8, 2004 || Socorro || LINEAR || — || align=right data-sort-value="0.89" | 890 m || 
|-id=771 bgcolor=#E9E9E9
| 288771 ||  || — || September 8, 2004 || Palomar || NEAT || — || align=right | 2.2 km || 
|-id=772 bgcolor=#fefefe
| 288772 ||  || — || September 8, 2004 || Socorro || LINEAR || V || align=right data-sort-value="0.77" | 770 m || 
|-id=773 bgcolor=#d6d6d6
| 288773 ||  || — || September 8, 2004 || Socorro || LINEAR || 628 || align=right | 2.6 km || 
|-id=774 bgcolor=#d6d6d6
| 288774 ||  || — || September 8, 2004 || Socorro || LINEAR || HYG || align=right | 3.3 km || 
|-id=775 bgcolor=#d6d6d6
| 288775 ||  || — || September 8, 2004 || Socorro || LINEAR || ALA || align=right | 4.3 km || 
|-id=776 bgcolor=#d6d6d6
| 288776 ||  || — || September 8, 2004 || Socorro || LINEAR || — || align=right | 3.6 km || 
|-id=777 bgcolor=#d6d6d6
| 288777 ||  || — || September 8, 2004 || Socorro || LINEAR || — || align=right | 3.9 km || 
|-id=778 bgcolor=#d6d6d6
| 288778 ||  || — || September 8, 2004 || Socorro || LINEAR || — || align=right | 3.3 km || 
|-id=779 bgcolor=#fefefe
| 288779 ||  || — || September 8, 2004 || Socorro || LINEAR || — || align=right data-sort-value="0.80" | 800 m || 
|-id=780 bgcolor=#d6d6d6
| 288780 ||  || — || September 8, 2004 || Socorro || LINEAR || — || align=right | 3.5 km || 
|-id=781 bgcolor=#fefefe
| 288781 ||  || — || September 9, 2004 || Socorro || LINEAR || — || align=right | 1.2 km || 
|-id=782 bgcolor=#d6d6d6
| 288782 ||  || — || September 9, 2004 || Kitt Peak || Spacewatch || EOS || align=right | 2.6 km || 
|-id=783 bgcolor=#FA8072
| 288783 ||  || — || September 9, 2004 || Kitt Peak || Spacewatch || — || align=right data-sort-value="0.71" | 710 m || 
|-id=784 bgcolor=#fefefe
| 288784 ||  || — || September 7, 2004 || Kitt Peak || Spacewatch || MAS || align=right data-sort-value="0.73" | 730 m || 
|-id=785 bgcolor=#d6d6d6
| 288785 ||  || — || September 7, 2004 || Kitt Peak || Spacewatch || — || align=right | 2.7 km || 
|-id=786 bgcolor=#fefefe
| 288786 ||  || — || September 7, 2004 || Palomar || NEAT || — || align=right | 1.5 km || 
|-id=787 bgcolor=#d6d6d6
| 288787 ||  || — || September 7, 2004 || Socorro || LINEAR || — || align=right | 3.9 km || 
|-id=788 bgcolor=#E9E9E9
| 288788 ||  || — || September 7, 2004 || Kitt Peak || Spacewatch || MRX || align=right | 1.3 km || 
|-id=789 bgcolor=#d6d6d6
| 288789 ||  || — || September 8, 2004 || Palomar || NEAT || ALA || align=right | 5.4 km || 
|-id=790 bgcolor=#fefefe
| 288790 ||  || — || September 8, 2004 || Socorro || LINEAR || — || align=right data-sort-value="0.80" | 800 m || 
|-id=791 bgcolor=#d6d6d6
| 288791 ||  || — || September 8, 2004 || Socorro || LINEAR || — || align=right | 5.5 km || 
|-id=792 bgcolor=#d6d6d6
| 288792 ||  || — || September 8, 2004 || Socorro || LINEAR || — || align=right | 2.9 km || 
|-id=793 bgcolor=#d6d6d6
| 288793 ||  || — || September 8, 2004 || Palomar || NEAT || — || align=right | 4.1 km || 
|-id=794 bgcolor=#fefefe
| 288794 ||  || — || September 8, 2004 || Socorro || LINEAR || — || align=right | 1.1 km || 
|-id=795 bgcolor=#fefefe
| 288795 ||  || — || September 9, 2004 || Socorro || LINEAR || — || align=right data-sort-value="0.94" | 940 m || 
|-id=796 bgcolor=#E9E9E9
| 288796 ||  || — || September 9, 2004 || Socorro || LINEAR || — || align=right | 1.6 km || 
|-id=797 bgcolor=#E9E9E9
| 288797 ||  || — || September 9, 2004 || Socorro || LINEAR || — || align=right | 3.8 km || 
|-id=798 bgcolor=#d6d6d6
| 288798 ||  || — || September 10, 2004 || Socorro || LINEAR || — || align=right | 3.7 km || 
|-id=799 bgcolor=#fefefe
| 288799 ||  || — || September 10, 2004 || Socorro || LINEAR || — || align=right | 1.3 km || 
|-id=800 bgcolor=#fefefe
| 288800 ||  || — || September 10, 2004 || Socorro || LINEAR || — || align=right | 1.2 km || 
|}

288801–288900 

|-bgcolor=#d6d6d6
| 288801 ||  || — || September 10, 2004 || Socorro || LINEAR || — || align=right | 3.1 km || 
|-id=802 bgcolor=#fefefe
| 288802 ||  || — || September 10, 2004 || Socorro || LINEAR || — || align=right data-sort-value="0.98" | 980 m || 
|-id=803 bgcolor=#d6d6d6
| 288803 ||  || — || September 10, 2004 || Socorro || LINEAR || — || align=right | 3.7 km || 
|-id=804 bgcolor=#fefefe
| 288804 ||  || — || September 10, 2004 || Socorro || LINEAR || — || align=right data-sort-value="0.98" | 980 m || 
|-id=805 bgcolor=#fefefe
| 288805 ||  || — || September 10, 2004 || Socorro || LINEAR || — || align=right data-sort-value="0.86" | 860 m || 
|-id=806 bgcolor=#fefefe
| 288806 ||  || — || September 11, 2004 || Kitt Peak || Spacewatch || — || align=right | 1.1 km || 
|-id=807 bgcolor=#FFC2E0
| 288807 ||  || — || September 13, 2004 || Kitt Peak || Spacewatch || APO || align=right data-sort-value="0.71" | 710 m || 
|-id=808 bgcolor=#d6d6d6
| 288808 ||  || — || September 7, 2004 || Socorro || LINEAR || LUT || align=right | 6.2 km || 
|-id=809 bgcolor=#fefefe
| 288809 ||  || — || September 8, 2004 || Socorro || LINEAR || V || align=right data-sort-value="0.56" | 560 m || 
|-id=810 bgcolor=#d6d6d6
| 288810 ||  || — || September 8, 2004 || Palomar || NEAT || BRA || align=right | 1.9 km || 
|-id=811 bgcolor=#fefefe
| 288811 ||  || — || September 8, 2004 || Palomar || NEAT || NYS || align=right | 2.1 km || 
|-id=812 bgcolor=#fefefe
| 288812 ||  || — || September 9, 2004 || Socorro || LINEAR || — || align=right | 1.2 km || 
|-id=813 bgcolor=#E9E9E9
| 288813 ||  || — || September 9, 2004 || Kitt Peak || Spacewatch || RAF || align=right | 1.2 km || 
|-id=814 bgcolor=#d6d6d6
| 288814 ||  || — || September 10, 2004 || Socorro || LINEAR || — || align=right | 4.3 km || 
|-id=815 bgcolor=#d6d6d6
| 288815 ||  || — || August 12, 2004 || Palomar || NEAT || TIR || align=right | 3.3 km || 
|-id=816 bgcolor=#fefefe
| 288816 ||  || — || September 10, 2004 || Socorro || LINEAR || — || align=right | 1.1 km || 
|-id=817 bgcolor=#E9E9E9
| 288817 ||  || — || September 10, 2004 || Socorro || LINEAR || GEF || align=right | 2.0 km || 
|-id=818 bgcolor=#E9E9E9
| 288818 ||  || — || September 10, 2004 || Socorro || LINEAR || — || align=right | 4.8 km || 
|-id=819 bgcolor=#fefefe
| 288819 ||  || — || September 10, 2004 || Socorro || LINEAR || — || align=right data-sort-value="0.94" | 940 m || 
|-id=820 bgcolor=#d6d6d6
| 288820 ||  || — || September 10, 2004 || Socorro || LINEAR || EOS || align=right | 2.6 km || 
|-id=821 bgcolor=#fefefe
| 288821 ||  || — || September 10, 2004 || Socorro || LINEAR || — || align=right | 1.2 km || 
|-id=822 bgcolor=#fefefe
| 288822 ||  || — || September 10, 2004 || Socorro || LINEAR || — || align=right data-sort-value="0.77" | 770 m || 
|-id=823 bgcolor=#fefefe
| 288823 ||  || — || September 10, 2004 || Socorro || LINEAR || V || align=right data-sort-value="0.82" | 820 m || 
|-id=824 bgcolor=#d6d6d6
| 288824 ||  || — || September 10, 2004 || Socorro || LINEAR || EOS || align=right | 3.0 km || 
|-id=825 bgcolor=#d6d6d6
| 288825 ||  || — || September 10, 2004 || Socorro || LINEAR || HYG || align=right | 3.4 km || 
|-id=826 bgcolor=#fefefe
| 288826 ||  || — || September 10, 2004 || Socorro || LINEAR || FLO || align=right data-sort-value="0.72" | 720 m || 
|-id=827 bgcolor=#fefefe
| 288827 ||  || — || September 10, 2004 || Socorro || LINEAR || V || align=right data-sort-value="0.98" | 980 m || 
|-id=828 bgcolor=#fefefe
| 288828 ||  || — || September 10, 2004 || Socorro || LINEAR || V || align=right data-sort-value="0.80" | 800 m || 
|-id=829 bgcolor=#d6d6d6
| 288829 ||  || — || September 10, 2004 || Socorro || LINEAR || — || align=right | 3.4 km || 
|-id=830 bgcolor=#fefefe
| 288830 ||  || — || September 10, 2004 || Socorro || LINEAR || — || align=right data-sort-value="0.98" | 980 m || 
|-id=831 bgcolor=#fefefe
| 288831 ||  || — || September 10, 2004 || Socorro || LINEAR || V || align=right data-sort-value="0.92" | 920 m || 
|-id=832 bgcolor=#d6d6d6
| 288832 ||  || — || September 10, 2004 || Socorro || LINEAR || EOS || align=right | 3.2 km || 
|-id=833 bgcolor=#fefefe
| 288833 ||  || — || September 10, 2004 || Socorro || LINEAR || V || align=right data-sort-value="0.96" | 960 m || 
|-id=834 bgcolor=#d6d6d6
| 288834 ||  || — || September 10, 2004 || Socorro || LINEAR || — || align=right | 3.8 km || 
|-id=835 bgcolor=#fefefe
| 288835 ||  || — || September 10, 2004 || Socorro || LINEAR || FLO || align=right data-sort-value="0.98" | 980 m || 
|-id=836 bgcolor=#fefefe
| 288836 ||  || — || September 10, 2004 || Socorro || LINEAR || — || align=right | 1.1 km || 
|-id=837 bgcolor=#fefefe
| 288837 ||  || — || September 10, 2004 || Socorro || LINEAR || — || align=right data-sort-value="0.90" | 900 m || 
|-id=838 bgcolor=#fefefe
| 288838 ||  || — || September 10, 2004 || Socorro || LINEAR || V || align=right data-sort-value="0.90" | 900 m || 
|-id=839 bgcolor=#d6d6d6
| 288839 ||  || — || September 10, 2004 || Socorro || LINEAR || — || align=right | 3.9 km || 
|-id=840 bgcolor=#d6d6d6
| 288840 ||  || — || September 10, 2004 || Socorro || LINEAR || — || align=right | 4.0 km || 
|-id=841 bgcolor=#E9E9E9
| 288841 ||  || — || September 11, 2004 || Socorro || LINEAR || — || align=right | 3.7 km || 
|-id=842 bgcolor=#d6d6d6
| 288842 ||  || — || September 11, 2004 || Socorro || LINEAR || EOS || align=right | 2.7 km || 
|-id=843 bgcolor=#fefefe
| 288843 ||  || — || September 11, 2004 || Kitt Peak || Spacewatch || — || align=right data-sort-value="0.95" | 950 m || 
|-id=844 bgcolor=#E9E9E9
| 288844 ||  || — || September 12, 2004 || Socorro || LINEAR || GAL || align=right | 2.5 km || 
|-id=845 bgcolor=#d6d6d6
| 288845 ||  || — || September 12, 2004 || Socorro || LINEAR || — || align=right | 2.9 km || 
|-id=846 bgcolor=#E9E9E9
| 288846 ||  || — || September 12, 2004 || Kitt Peak || Spacewatch || — || align=right | 4.1 km || 
|-id=847 bgcolor=#d6d6d6
| 288847 ||  || — || September 12, 2004 || Kitt Peak || Spacewatch || — || align=right | 5.4 km || 
|-id=848 bgcolor=#fefefe
| 288848 ||  || — || February 10, 2003 || Kitt Peak || Spacewatch || FLO || align=right data-sort-value="0.83" | 830 m || 
|-id=849 bgcolor=#fefefe
| 288849 ||  || — || September 8, 2004 || Socorro || LINEAR || — || align=right data-sort-value="0.94" | 940 m || 
|-id=850 bgcolor=#d6d6d6
| 288850 ||  || — || September 10, 2004 || Socorro || LINEAR || LIX || align=right | 5.6 km || 
|-id=851 bgcolor=#fefefe
| 288851 ||  || — || September 10, 2004 || Socorro || LINEAR || FLO || align=right data-sort-value="0.78" | 780 m || 
|-id=852 bgcolor=#E9E9E9
| 288852 ||  || — || September 11, 2004 || Socorro || LINEAR || — || align=right | 4.1 km || 
|-id=853 bgcolor=#d6d6d6
| 288853 ||  || — || September 11, 2004 || Socorro || LINEAR || TIR || align=right | 4.6 km || 
|-id=854 bgcolor=#E9E9E9
| 288854 ||  || — || September 11, 2004 || Socorro || LINEAR || — || align=right | 1.2 km || 
|-id=855 bgcolor=#E9E9E9
| 288855 ||  || — || September 11, 2004 || Socorro || LINEAR || — || align=right | 1.5 km || 
|-id=856 bgcolor=#d6d6d6
| 288856 ||  || — || September 11, 2004 || Socorro || LINEAR || ARM || align=right | 5.1 km || 
|-id=857 bgcolor=#d6d6d6
| 288857 ||  || — || September 11, 2004 || Socorro || LINEAR || — || align=right | 4.8 km || 
|-id=858 bgcolor=#d6d6d6
| 288858 ||  || — || September 11, 2004 || Socorro || LINEAR || — || align=right | 5.4 km || 
|-id=859 bgcolor=#d6d6d6
| 288859 ||  || — || September 11, 2004 || Socorro || LINEAR || THB || align=right | 4.4 km || 
|-id=860 bgcolor=#fefefe
| 288860 ||  || — || September 14, 2004 || Socorro || LINEAR || PHO || align=right | 3.5 km || 
|-id=861 bgcolor=#d6d6d6
| 288861 ||  || — || September 9, 2004 || Socorro || LINEAR || — || align=right | 2.8 km || 
|-id=862 bgcolor=#fefefe
| 288862 ||  || — || September 9, 2004 || Socorro || LINEAR || — || align=right | 1.2 km || 
|-id=863 bgcolor=#E9E9E9
| 288863 ||  || — || September 9, 2004 || Socorro || LINEAR || — || align=right | 2.2 km || 
|-id=864 bgcolor=#fefefe
| 288864 ||  || — || September 9, 2004 || Socorro || LINEAR || — || align=right | 1.2 km || 
|-id=865 bgcolor=#d6d6d6
| 288865 ||  || — || September 9, 2004 || Kitt Peak || Spacewatch || EOS || align=right | 2.6 km || 
|-id=866 bgcolor=#d6d6d6
| 288866 ||  || — || September 9, 2004 || Kitt Peak || Spacewatch || — || align=right | 4.4 km || 
|-id=867 bgcolor=#fefefe
| 288867 ||  || — || September 9, 2004 || Kitt Peak || Spacewatch || — || align=right data-sort-value="0.95" | 950 m || 
|-id=868 bgcolor=#E9E9E9
| 288868 ||  || — || September 9, 2004 || Kitt Peak || Spacewatch || MRX || align=right | 1.4 km || 
|-id=869 bgcolor=#d6d6d6
| 288869 ||  || — || September 9, 2004 || Kitt Peak || Spacewatch || — || align=right | 3.2 km || 
|-id=870 bgcolor=#d6d6d6
| 288870 ||  || — || September 9, 2004 || Kitt Peak || Spacewatch || — || align=right | 4.0 km || 
|-id=871 bgcolor=#fefefe
| 288871 ||  || — || September 9, 2004 || Kitt Peak || Spacewatch || — || align=right | 1.7 km || 
|-id=872 bgcolor=#d6d6d6
| 288872 ||  || — || September 9, 2004 || Kitt Peak || Spacewatch || THM || align=right | 2.5 km || 
|-id=873 bgcolor=#fefefe
| 288873 ||  || — || September 9, 2004 || Kitt Peak || Spacewatch || — || align=right | 1.1 km || 
|-id=874 bgcolor=#d6d6d6
| 288874 ||  || — || September 10, 2004 || Socorro || LINEAR || — || align=right | 3.7 km || 
|-id=875 bgcolor=#d6d6d6
| 288875 ||  || — || September 10, 2004 || Socorro || LINEAR || — || align=right | 4.5 km || 
|-id=876 bgcolor=#d6d6d6
| 288876 ||  || — || September 10, 2004 || Kitt Peak || Spacewatch || — || align=right | 2.9 km || 
|-id=877 bgcolor=#E9E9E9
| 288877 ||  || — || September 10, 2004 || Kitt Peak || Spacewatch || — || align=right | 1.3 km || 
|-id=878 bgcolor=#fefefe
| 288878 ||  || — || September 10, 2004 || Kitt Peak || Spacewatch || — || align=right data-sort-value="0.91" | 910 m || 
|-id=879 bgcolor=#d6d6d6
| 288879 ||  || — || September 10, 2004 || Kitt Peak || Spacewatch || KOR || align=right | 1.6 km || 
|-id=880 bgcolor=#d6d6d6
| 288880 ||  || — || September 10, 2004 || Kitt Peak || Spacewatch || — || align=right | 2.4 km || 
|-id=881 bgcolor=#E9E9E9
| 288881 ||  || — || September 10, 2004 || Kitt Peak || Spacewatch || — || align=right | 1.4 km || 
|-id=882 bgcolor=#d6d6d6
| 288882 ||  || — || September 10, 2004 || Kitt Peak || Spacewatch || — || align=right | 2.8 km || 
|-id=883 bgcolor=#E9E9E9
| 288883 ||  || — || September 10, 2004 || Kitt Peak || Spacewatch || — || align=right | 2.3 km || 
|-id=884 bgcolor=#d6d6d6
| 288884 ||  || — || September 11, 2004 || Socorro || LINEAR || LIX || align=right | 4.4 km || 
|-id=885 bgcolor=#d6d6d6
| 288885 ||  || — || September 12, 2004 || Socorro || LINEAR || EUP || align=right | 6.9 km || 
|-id=886 bgcolor=#fefefe
| 288886 ||  || — || September 13, 2004 || Palomar || NEAT || — || align=right data-sort-value="0.84" | 840 m || 
|-id=887 bgcolor=#E9E9E9
| 288887 ||  || — || September 6, 2004 || Palomar || NEAT || MAR || align=right | 1.4 km || 
|-id=888 bgcolor=#d6d6d6
| 288888 ||  || — || September 6, 2004 || Siding Spring || SSS || — || align=right | 4.5 km || 
|-id=889 bgcolor=#E9E9E9
| 288889 ||  || — || September 11, 2004 || Kitt Peak || Spacewatch || — || align=right | 2.6 km || 
|-id=890 bgcolor=#d6d6d6
| 288890 ||  || — || September 11, 2004 || Socorro || LINEAR || — || align=right | 3.9 km || 
|-id=891 bgcolor=#fefefe
| 288891 ||  || — || September 13, 2004 || Kitt Peak || Spacewatch || V || align=right data-sort-value="0.87" | 870 m || 
|-id=892 bgcolor=#fefefe
| 288892 ||  || — || September 15, 2004 || 7300 Observatory || W. K. Y. Yeung || EUT || align=right data-sort-value="0.72" | 720 m || 
|-id=893 bgcolor=#E9E9E9
| 288893 ||  || — || September 8, 2004 || Socorro || LINEAR || MRX || align=right | 1.5 km || 
|-id=894 bgcolor=#d6d6d6
| 288894 ||  || — || September 10, 2004 || Socorro || LINEAR || BRA || align=right | 1.7 km || 
|-id=895 bgcolor=#d6d6d6
| 288895 ||  || — || September 11, 2004 || Kitt Peak || Spacewatch || — || align=right | 4.5 km || 
|-id=896 bgcolor=#fefefe
| 288896 ||  || — || September 12, 2004 || Kitt Peak || Spacewatch || — || align=right | 1.1 km || 
|-id=897 bgcolor=#fefefe
| 288897 ||  || — || September 12, 2004 || Socorro || LINEAR || — || align=right | 1.2 km || 
|-id=898 bgcolor=#fefefe
| 288898 ||  || — || September 12, 2004 || Socorro || LINEAR || H || align=right data-sort-value="0.89" | 890 m || 
|-id=899 bgcolor=#fefefe
| 288899 ||  || — || September 13, 2004 || Socorro || LINEAR || — || align=right | 1.1 km || 
|-id=900 bgcolor=#d6d6d6
| 288900 ||  || — || September 13, 2004 || Kitt Peak || Spacewatch || HYG || align=right | 3.0 km || 
|}

288901–289000 

|-bgcolor=#fefefe
| 288901 ||  || — || September 13, 2004 || Palomar || NEAT || — || align=right data-sort-value="0.96" | 960 m || 
|-id=902 bgcolor=#fefefe
| 288902 ||  || — || September 13, 2004 || Socorro || LINEAR || — || align=right | 1.3 km || 
|-id=903 bgcolor=#d6d6d6
| 288903 ||  || — || September 13, 2004 || Socorro || LINEAR || — || align=right | 3.8 km || 
|-id=904 bgcolor=#fefefe
| 288904 ||  || — || September 13, 2004 || Socorro || LINEAR || — || align=right | 1.1 km || 
|-id=905 bgcolor=#fefefe
| 288905 ||  || — || September 13, 2004 || Socorro || LINEAR || V || align=right data-sort-value="0.90" | 900 m || 
|-id=906 bgcolor=#fefefe
| 288906 ||  || — || September 13, 2004 || Palomar || NEAT || V || align=right data-sort-value="0.94" | 940 m || 
|-id=907 bgcolor=#fefefe
| 288907 ||  || — || September 14, 2004 || Palomar || NEAT || — || align=right | 1.2 km || 
|-id=908 bgcolor=#fefefe
| 288908 ||  || — || September 15, 2004 || Kitt Peak || Spacewatch || FLO || align=right | 2.3 km || 
|-id=909 bgcolor=#E9E9E9
| 288909 ||  || — || September 10, 2004 || Socorro || LINEAR || MRX || align=right | 1.3 km || 
|-id=910 bgcolor=#fefefe
| 288910 ||  || — || September 11, 2004 || Palomar || NEAT || — || align=right data-sort-value="0.95" | 950 m || 
|-id=911 bgcolor=#d6d6d6
| 288911 ||  || — || September 8, 2004 || Socorro || LINEAR || — || align=right | 3.9 km || 
|-id=912 bgcolor=#d6d6d6
| 288912 ||  || — || September 7, 2004 || Kitt Peak || Spacewatch || — || align=right | 2.9 km || 
|-id=913 bgcolor=#E9E9E9
| 288913 || 2004 ST || — || September 17, 2004 || Ottmarsheim || Ottmarsheim Obs. || JUN || align=right | 1.4 km || 
|-id=914 bgcolor=#FFC2E0
| 288914 ||  || — || September 17, 2004 || Socorro || LINEAR || AMO || align=right data-sort-value="0.56" | 560 m || 
|-id=915 bgcolor=#fefefe
| 288915 ||  || — || September 17, 2004 || Kitt Peak || Spacewatch || — || align=right | 1.0 km || 
|-id=916 bgcolor=#fefefe
| 288916 ||  || — || September 17, 2004 || Kitt Peak || Spacewatch || — || align=right data-sort-value="0.93" | 930 m || 
|-id=917 bgcolor=#d6d6d6
| 288917 ||  || — || September 18, 2004 || Socorro || LINEAR || — || align=right | 3.7 km || 
|-id=918 bgcolor=#E9E9E9
| 288918 ||  || — || September 16, 2004 || Kitt Peak || Spacewatch || — || align=right | 2.0 km || 
|-id=919 bgcolor=#d6d6d6
| 288919 ||  || — || September 16, 2004 || Siding Spring || SSS || 615 || align=right | 2.1 km || 
|-id=920 bgcolor=#fefefe
| 288920 ||  || — || September 17, 2004 || Anderson Mesa || LONEOS || — || align=right | 1.2 km || 
|-id=921 bgcolor=#d6d6d6
| 288921 ||  || — || September 17, 2004 || Anderson Mesa || LONEOS || — || align=right | 4.1 km || 
|-id=922 bgcolor=#fefefe
| 288922 ||  || — || September 17, 2004 || Anderson Mesa || LONEOS || ERI || align=right | 1.8 km || 
|-id=923 bgcolor=#fefefe
| 288923 ||  || — || September 17, 2004 || Anderson Mesa || LONEOS || V || align=right data-sort-value="0.84" | 840 m || 
|-id=924 bgcolor=#d6d6d6
| 288924 ||  || — || September 18, 2004 || Socorro || LINEAR || — || align=right | 4.0 km || 
|-id=925 bgcolor=#fefefe
| 288925 ||  || — || September 17, 2004 || Kitt Peak || Spacewatch || V || align=right data-sort-value="0.77" | 770 m || 
|-id=926 bgcolor=#d6d6d6
| 288926 ||  || — || September 21, 2004 || Kitt Peak || Spacewatch || — || align=right | 3.3 km || 
|-id=927 bgcolor=#d6d6d6
| 288927 ||  || — || September 17, 2004 || Socorro || LINEAR || — || align=right | 2.6 km || 
|-id=928 bgcolor=#d6d6d6
| 288928 ||  || — || September 17, 2004 || Socorro || LINEAR || EOS || align=right | 2.8 km || 
|-id=929 bgcolor=#E9E9E9
| 288929 ||  || — || September 17, 2004 || Socorro || LINEAR || — || align=right | 3.1 km || 
|-id=930 bgcolor=#fefefe
| 288930 ||  || — || September 17, 2004 || Socorro || LINEAR || V || align=right data-sort-value="0.98" | 980 m || 
|-id=931 bgcolor=#fefefe
| 288931 ||  || — || September 17, 2004 || Socorro || LINEAR || — || align=right data-sort-value="0.87" | 870 m || 
|-id=932 bgcolor=#d6d6d6
| 288932 ||  || — || September 17, 2004 || Socorro || LINEAR || — || align=right | 5.4 km || 
|-id=933 bgcolor=#d6d6d6
| 288933 ||  || — || September 17, 2004 || Socorro || LINEAR || — || align=right | 4.8 km || 
|-id=934 bgcolor=#fefefe
| 288934 ||  || — || September 17, 2004 || Kitt Peak || Spacewatch || FLO || align=right | 2.9 km || 
|-id=935 bgcolor=#E9E9E9
| 288935 ||  || — || September 17, 2004 || Kitt Peak || Spacewatch || — || align=right | 2.7 km || 
|-id=936 bgcolor=#fefefe
| 288936 ||  || — || September 17, 2004 || Socorro || LINEAR || NYS || align=right data-sort-value="0.76" | 760 m || 
|-id=937 bgcolor=#fefefe
| 288937 ||  || — || September 18, 2004 || Socorro || LINEAR || FLO || align=right data-sort-value="0.77" | 770 m || 
|-id=938 bgcolor=#fefefe
| 288938 ||  || — || September 18, 2004 || Socorro || LINEAR || — || align=right data-sort-value="0.98" | 980 m || 
|-id=939 bgcolor=#fefefe
| 288939 ||  || — || September 18, 2004 || Socorro || LINEAR || — || align=right data-sort-value="0.78" | 780 m || 
|-id=940 bgcolor=#E9E9E9
| 288940 ||  || — || September 18, 2004 || Socorro || LINEAR || — || align=right | 2.0 km || 
|-id=941 bgcolor=#d6d6d6
| 288941 ||  || — || September 18, 2004 || Socorro || LINEAR || — || align=right | 4.1 km || 
|-id=942 bgcolor=#d6d6d6
| 288942 ||  || — || September 18, 2004 || Socorro || LINEAR || EMA || align=right | 4.3 km || 
|-id=943 bgcolor=#E9E9E9
| 288943 ||  || — || September 22, 2004 || Socorro || LINEAR || — || align=right | 1.0 km || 
|-id=944 bgcolor=#E9E9E9
| 288944 ||  || — || September 17, 2004 || Socorro || LINEAR || — || align=right | 1.3 km || 
|-id=945 bgcolor=#fefefe
| 288945 ||  || — || September 17, 2004 || Socorro || LINEAR || NYS || align=right data-sort-value="0.73" | 730 m || 
|-id=946 bgcolor=#E9E9E9
| 288946 ||  || — || September 17, 2004 || Socorro || LINEAR || — || align=right | 2.6 km || 
|-id=947 bgcolor=#fefefe
| 288947 ||  || — || September 18, 2004 || Socorro || LINEAR || — || align=right | 1.1 km || 
|-id=948 bgcolor=#d6d6d6
| 288948 ||  || — || September 22, 2004 || Socorro || LINEAR || — || align=right | 3.9 km || 
|-id=949 bgcolor=#fefefe
| 288949 ||  || — || September 22, 2004 || Socorro || LINEAR || NYS || align=right data-sort-value="0.72" | 720 m || 
|-id=950 bgcolor=#fefefe
| 288950 ||  || — || September 23, 2004 || Goodricke-Pigott || R. A. Tucker || NYS || align=right data-sort-value="0.77" | 770 m || 
|-id=951 bgcolor=#d6d6d6
| 288951 ||  || — || September 17, 2004 || Anderson Mesa || LONEOS || — || align=right | 4.6 km || 
|-id=952 bgcolor=#fefefe
| 288952 ||  || — || September 17, 2004 || Anderson Mesa || LONEOS || V || align=right | 1.0 km || 
|-id=953 bgcolor=#fefefe
| 288953 ||  || — || October 4, 2004 || Kitt Peak || Spacewatch || NYS || align=right data-sort-value="0.71" | 710 m || 
|-id=954 bgcolor=#d6d6d6
| 288954 ||  || — || October 4, 2004 || Kitt Peak || Spacewatch || — || align=right | 3.5 km || 
|-id=955 bgcolor=#E9E9E9
| 288955 ||  || — || October 2, 2004 || Palomar || NEAT || MAR || align=right | 1.6 km || 
|-id=956 bgcolor=#fefefe
| 288956 ||  || — || October 3, 2004 || Palomar || NEAT || — || align=right | 1.4 km || 
|-id=957 bgcolor=#fefefe
| 288957 ||  || — || October 7, 2004 || Wrightwood || J. W. Young || — || align=right data-sort-value="0.98" | 980 m || 
|-id=958 bgcolor=#d6d6d6
| 288958 ||  || — || October 7, 2004 || Socorro || LINEAR || — || align=right | 2.5 km || 
|-id=959 bgcolor=#fefefe
| 288959 ||  || — || October 11, 2004 || Moletai || Molėtai Obs. || V || align=right data-sort-value="0.90" | 900 m || 
|-id=960 bgcolor=#d6d6d6
| 288960 Steponasdarius ||  ||  || October 11, 2004 || Moletai || K. Černis, J. Zdanavičius || EOS || align=right | 2.7 km || 
|-id=961 bgcolor=#E9E9E9
| 288961 Stasysgirėnas ||  ||  || October 12, 2004 || Moletai || K. Černis, J. Zdanavičius || — || align=right | 3.7 km || 
|-id=962 bgcolor=#fefefe
| 288962 ||  || — || October 4, 2004 || Kitt Peak || Spacewatch || V || align=right data-sort-value="0.74" | 740 m || 
|-id=963 bgcolor=#d6d6d6
| 288963 ||  || — || October 4, 2004 || Kitt Peak || Spacewatch || — || align=right | 2.7 km || 
|-id=964 bgcolor=#d6d6d6
| 288964 ||  || — || October 4, 2004 || Kitt Peak || Spacewatch || — || align=right | 2.7 km || 
|-id=965 bgcolor=#d6d6d6
| 288965 ||  || — || October 4, 2004 || Kitt Peak || Spacewatch || — || align=right | 4.8 km || 
|-id=966 bgcolor=#fefefe
| 288966 ||  || — || October 4, 2004 || Kitt Peak || Spacewatch || MAS || align=right data-sort-value="0.82" | 820 m || 
|-id=967 bgcolor=#d6d6d6
| 288967 ||  || — || October 4, 2004 || Kitt Peak || Spacewatch || — || align=right | 3.8 km || 
|-id=968 bgcolor=#fefefe
| 288968 ||  || — || October 4, 2004 || Kitt Peak || Spacewatch || — || align=right | 1.0 km || 
|-id=969 bgcolor=#d6d6d6
| 288969 ||  || — || October 4, 2004 || Kitt Peak || Spacewatch || — || align=right | 3.4 km || 
|-id=970 bgcolor=#fefefe
| 288970 ||  || — || October 4, 2004 || Kitt Peak || Spacewatch || — || align=right data-sort-value="0.86" | 860 m || 
|-id=971 bgcolor=#d6d6d6
| 288971 ||  || — || October 4, 2004 || Kitt Peak || Spacewatch || — || align=right | 1.7 km || 
|-id=972 bgcolor=#fefefe
| 288972 ||  || — || October 4, 2004 || Anderson Mesa || LONEOS || — || align=right | 1.3 km || 
|-id=973 bgcolor=#fefefe
| 288973 ||  || — || October 4, 2004 || Kitt Peak || Spacewatch || — || align=right | 1.2 km || 
|-id=974 bgcolor=#E9E9E9
| 288974 ||  || — || October 4, 2004 || Kitt Peak || Spacewatch || — || align=right | 1.4 km || 
|-id=975 bgcolor=#fefefe
| 288975 ||  || — || October 4, 2004 || Kitt Peak || Spacewatch || NYS || align=right data-sort-value="0.79" | 790 m || 
|-id=976 bgcolor=#fefefe
| 288976 ||  || — || October 4, 2004 || Kitt Peak || Spacewatch || — || align=right | 1.0 km || 
|-id=977 bgcolor=#E9E9E9
| 288977 ||  || — || October 4, 2004 || Kitt Peak || Spacewatch || — || align=right | 1.0 km || 
|-id=978 bgcolor=#d6d6d6
| 288978 ||  || — || October 4, 2004 || Kitt Peak || Spacewatch || — || align=right | 3.0 km || 
|-id=979 bgcolor=#d6d6d6
| 288979 ||  || — || October 4, 2004 || Kitt Peak || Spacewatch || THM || align=right | 2.6 km || 
|-id=980 bgcolor=#fefefe
| 288980 ||  || — || October 4, 2004 || Kitt Peak || Spacewatch || — || align=right data-sort-value="0.88" | 880 m || 
|-id=981 bgcolor=#d6d6d6
| 288981 ||  || — || October 4, 2004 || Kitt Peak || Spacewatch || HYG || align=right | 3.9 km || 
|-id=982 bgcolor=#fefefe
| 288982 ||  || — || October 4, 2004 || Kitt Peak || Spacewatch || — || align=right | 1.2 km || 
|-id=983 bgcolor=#fefefe
| 288983 ||  || — || October 4, 2004 || Kitt Peak || Spacewatch || NYS || align=right data-sort-value="0.67" | 670 m || 
|-id=984 bgcolor=#fefefe
| 288984 ||  || — || October 4, 2004 || Kitt Peak || Spacewatch || NYS || align=right data-sort-value="0.91" | 910 m || 
|-id=985 bgcolor=#E9E9E9
| 288985 ||  || — || October 4, 2004 || Kitt Peak || Spacewatch || — || align=right | 1.6 km || 
|-id=986 bgcolor=#d6d6d6
| 288986 ||  || — || October 4, 2004 || Kitt Peak || Spacewatch || — || align=right | 4.0 km || 
|-id=987 bgcolor=#fefefe
| 288987 ||  || — || October 4, 2004 || Kitt Peak || Spacewatch || FLO || align=right data-sort-value="0.71" | 710 m || 
|-id=988 bgcolor=#d6d6d6
| 288988 ||  || — || October 5, 2004 || Kitt Peak || Spacewatch || — || align=right | 3.3 km || 
|-id=989 bgcolor=#d6d6d6
| 288989 ||  || — || October 5, 2004 || Anderson Mesa || LONEOS || ELF || align=right | 4.9 km || 
|-id=990 bgcolor=#fefefe
| 288990 ||  || — || October 5, 2004 || Anderson Mesa || LONEOS || NYS || align=right data-sort-value="0.72" | 720 m || 
|-id=991 bgcolor=#d6d6d6
| 288991 ||  || — || October 5, 2004 || Anderson Mesa || LONEOS || — || align=right | 4.5 km || 
|-id=992 bgcolor=#fefefe
| 288992 ||  || — || October 5, 2004 || Anderson Mesa || LONEOS || NYS || align=right data-sort-value="0.89" | 890 m || 
|-id=993 bgcolor=#E9E9E9
| 288993 ||  || — || October 5, 2004 || Anderson Mesa || LONEOS || — || align=right | 3.5 km || 
|-id=994 bgcolor=#d6d6d6
| 288994 ||  || — || October 5, 2004 || Kitt Peak || Spacewatch || — || align=right | 3.5 km || 
|-id=995 bgcolor=#d6d6d6
| 288995 ||  || — || October 5, 2004 || Kitt Peak || Spacewatch || THM || align=right | 4.4 km || 
|-id=996 bgcolor=#fefefe
| 288996 ||  || — || October 5, 2004 || Anderson Mesa || LONEOS || — || align=right | 1.2 km || 
|-id=997 bgcolor=#fefefe
| 288997 ||  || — || October 5, 2004 || Anderson Mesa || LONEOS || — || align=right | 1.1 km || 
|-id=998 bgcolor=#fefefe
| 288998 ||  || — || October 5, 2004 || Anderson Mesa || LONEOS || V || align=right | 1.1 km || 
|-id=999 bgcolor=#fefefe
| 288999 ||  || — || October 5, 2004 || Anderson Mesa || LONEOS || — || align=right | 1.1 km || 
|-id=000 bgcolor=#d6d6d6
| 289000 ||  || — || October 6, 2004 || Kitt Peak || Spacewatch || EOS || align=right | 2.4 km || 
|}

References

External links 
 Discovery Circumstances: Numbered Minor Planets (285001)–(290000) (IAU Minor Planet Center)

0288